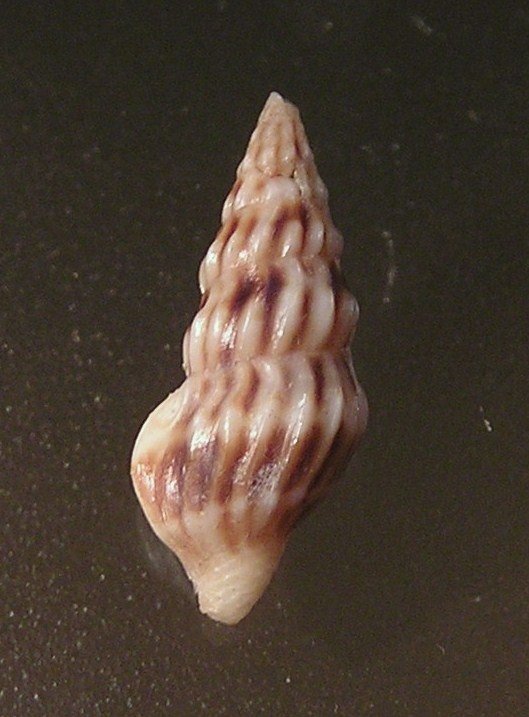
- Iredalea inclinata, abapertural view

Scientific classification
- Kingdom: Animalia
- Phylum: Mollusca
- Class: Gastropoda
- Subclass: Caenogastropoda
- Order: Neogastropoda
- Superfamily: Conoidea
- Family: Drilliidae
- Genus: Iredalea; Oliver, 1915

Type species
- Iredalea subtropicalis Oliver, 1915

Species
- See text

Synonyms
- Brephodrillia Pilsbry & Lowe, 1932

= Iredalea =

Genus of gastropods

Iredalea is a small genus of sea snails, marine gastropod mollusks in the family Drilliidae.

This genus was named in 1915 by Walter Oliver after Tom Iredale (1880–1972), an English-born naturalist who lived mainly in Australia.

Fossil species have been found in Pliocene strata of Italy and in Miocene strata of Indonesia; age range: 5.332 to 2.588 Ma.

== Description ==
The narrow, solid and turreted shell has a fusiform shape. The protoconch consists of 4 whorls, with a sinusigera apex. The shell is axially sculptured by numerous slender and continuous riblets. The aperture measures about a third of the length of the shell. The short siphonal canal is wide. The anal sinus is deep and broad, separated from the body whorl by a callosity. A brown band on the periphery is a usual feature.

== Species ==
Species within the genus Iredalea include:

- Iredalea adenensis Morassi & Bonfitto, 2013
- Iredalea agatho (W.H. Dall, 1918)
- Iredalea balteata (A.A. Gould, 1860)
- Iredalea exilis (Pease, 1868)
- Iredalea inclinata (Sowerby III, 1893)
- Iredalea macleayi (Brazier, 1876)
- Iredalea pupoidea (H. Adams, 1872)
- Iredalea pygmaea (Dunker, 1860)
- Iredalea subtropicalis Oliver, 1915
- Iredalea thalycra (J.C. Melvill & R. Standen, 1896)
- Iredalea theoteles (Melvill & Standen, 1896)

Species brought into synonymy

- Iredalea acuminata (J.W. Mighels, 1848): synonym of Pyrgocythara mighelsi (Kay, 1979)
- Iredalea ella (Pilsbry & Lowe, 1932): synonym of Brephodrillia ella Pilsbry & Lowe, 1932
- Iredalea (Brephodrillia) perfecta (Pilsbry & Lowe, 1932): synonym of Brephodrillia perfectus Pilsbry & Lowe, 1932
