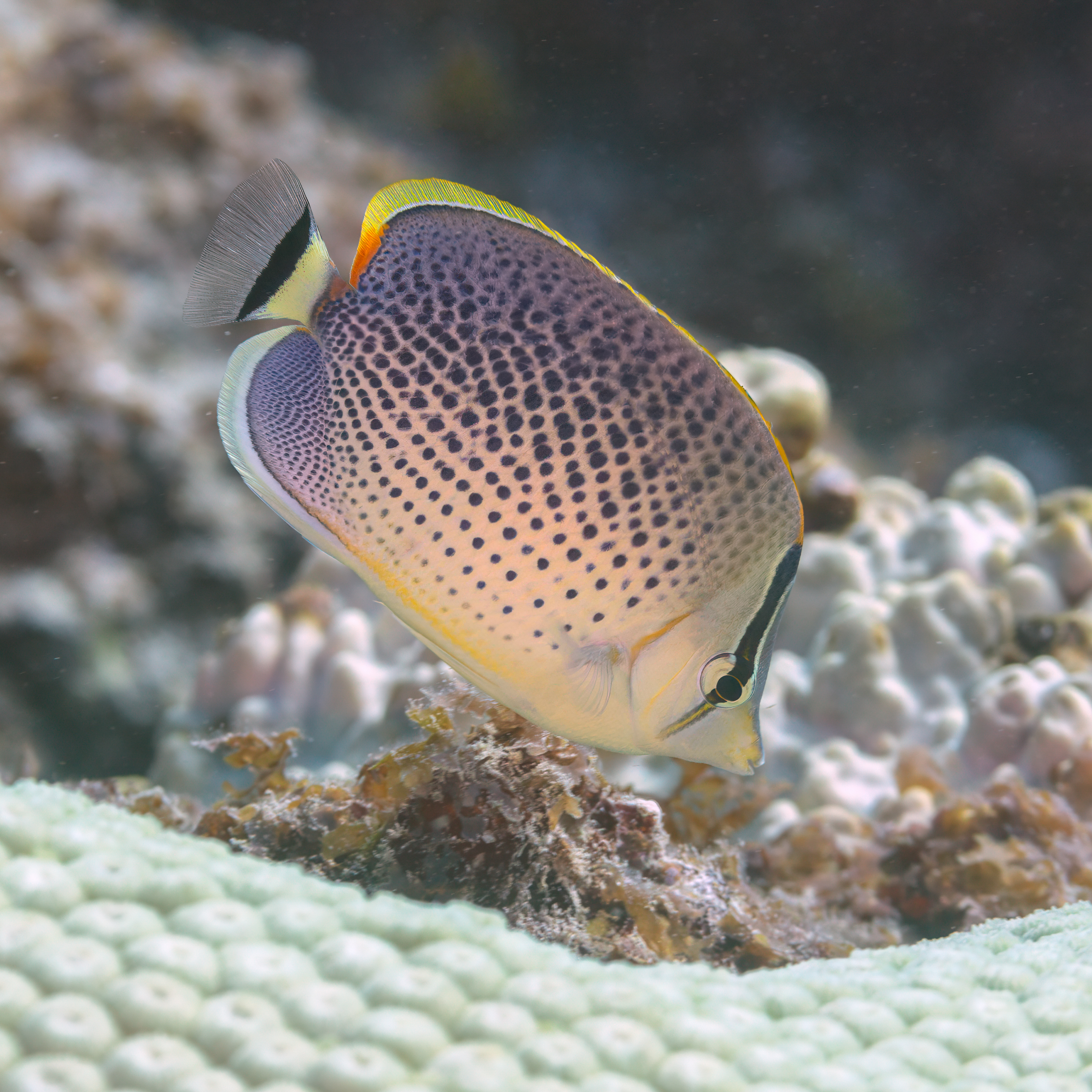
- Zanzibar, Tanzania

Conservation status
- Least Concern (IUCN 3.1)

Scientific classification
- Kingdom: Animalia
- Phylum: Chordata
- Class: Actinopterygii
- Division: Teleostei
- Order: Acanthuriformes
- Family: Chaetodontidae
- Genus: Chaetodon
- Subgenus: Chaetodon (Exornator)
- Species: C. guttatissimus

Binomial name
- Chaetodon guttatissimus E. T. Bennett, 1833

Synonyms
- Chaetodon maculatus Sauvage, 1891

= Peppered butterflyfish =

Species of fish

The peppered butterflyfish (Chaetodon guttatissimus) is a species marine ray-finned fish, a butterflyfish from the (family Chaetodontidae). It is found in the Indian Ocean.

== Description ==
The peppered butterflyfish is silvery white in colour marked with irregular vertical rows of dark spots or speckles on the flanks, these reorient to a more horizontal plane on the lower flanks. There is a thin, vertical dark bar running through the eye> The rear of the dorsal fin has an orange bar and this reaches the upper part of the caudal peduncle. The caudal fin has a black submarginal band while the dorsal fin has a yellow margin. The dorsal fin contains 12–13 spines and 22–24 soft rays while the anal fin has 3 spines and 16–18 soft rays. This fish attains a maximum total length of 12 centimetres (4.7 in).

== Distribution ==
The peppered butterflyfish is found in the Indian Ocean where its range extends from the East African coast where it ranges from Somalia to South Africa and across the Indian Ocean as far east as Bali in Indonesia and the Australian territories of Christmas Island and the Cocos (Keeling) Islands. It appears to avoid the mainland coasts of Southern Asia but can be found in the Maldives, off Sri Lanka and the Indian islands of the Andamans and the Nicobars and other islands in the Andaman Sea.

== Habitat and biology ==
The peppered butterflyfish is found in coral rich areas in lagoons and seaward reef slopes, where it lives either as solitary individuals or in pairs. It may be encountered in small schools. It feeds on invertebrates such as polychaetes as well as algae. However, a large part of its diet is coral polyps and it may be an obligate coral eater. It is an oviparous species which breeds in pairs.

== Taxonomy ==
The peppered butterflyfish was first formally described in by the 1833 by the English zoologist Edward Turner Bennett (1797–1836) with the type locality given as Sri Lanka. This is one of the members of the subgenus Exornator. It is part of a close-knit group which also includes the pebbled butterflyfish (C. multicinctus), the spot-banded butterflyfish (C. punctatofasciatus) and the sunset butterflyfish (C. pelewensis). It is suspected that these four are able to produce fertile hybrids. If the genus Chaetodon is split up, Exornator might become a subgenus of Lepidochaetodon. It is known to hybridise with the spot-banded butterflyfish.

== Utilisation and threats ==
The peppered butterflyfish is difficult to keep in captivity and is rare in the aquarium trade. As a species which is likely to be an obligate corallivore it needs live coral to feed on and it would be expected to suffer population declines following coral die offs or bleaching events. However, an event of this kind in the Seychelles did not lead to an observed decrease in the population of peppered butterflyfish.
