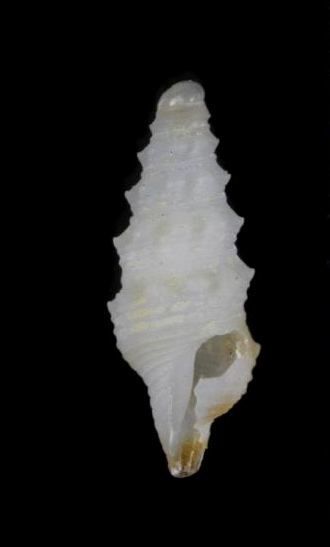
- Shell of a Ceritoturris sp. (specimen at MNHN, Paris)

Scientific classification
- Kingdom: Animalia
- Phylum: Mollusca
- Class: Gastropoda
- Subclass: Caenogastropoda
- Order: Neogastropoda
- Superfamily: Conoidea
- Family: Horaiclavidae
- Genus: Ceritoturris; Dall, 1924

Type species
- Crassispira bittium Dall, 1924

Species
- See text

Synonyms
- Crassispira (Ceritoturris) Dall, 1924 (original rank)

= Ceritoturris =

Genus of gastropods

Ceritoturris is a genus of sea snails, marine gastropod mollusks in the family Horaiclavidae.

It was previously included within the subfamily Crassispirinae, family Turridae.

Fossils of Ceritoturris fecunda Lozouet, 1999 have been found in Miocene strata of Germany; age range: 15.97 to 11.608 Ma. and late Oligocene strata in the Aquitaine Basin

== Description ==
The minute shell has a blunt protoconch. The second whorl shows a peripheral keel. The seven subsequent whorls are moderately rounded, axially and spirally sculptured. The siphonal canal is almost obsolete.

== Species ==
Species within the genus Ceritoturris include:

- Ceritoturris bittium (Dall, 1924)
- † Ceritoturris fecunda Lozouet, 1999
- † Ceritoturris littoralis Lozouet, 2017
- Ceritoturris nataliae Kilburn, 1988
- † Ceritoturris philippei Lozouet, 2017
- Ceritoturris pupiformis (E. A. Smith, 1884)
- Ceritoturris suavis (Hervier, 1896)
- Ceritoturris thailandica Robba et al., 2006

Species brought into synonymy

- Ceritoturris papillosa (Garrett, 1873): synonym of Carinapex papillosa (Garrett, 1873)
- Ceritoturris theoteles (Melvill & Standen, 1896): synonym of Iredalea theoteles (Melvill & Standen, 1896)
