= Daphnobela =

Scientific classification
- Kingdom: Animalia
- Phylum: Mollusca
- Class: Gastropoda
- Subclass: Caenogastropoda
- Order: Neogastropoda
- Superfamily: Buccinoidea
- Family: Fasciolariidae
- Genus: †Daphnobela; Cossmann, 1896

Species
- See text

Synonyms
- † Bela (Daphnobela) Cossmann, 1896 (original rank); † Pisania (Daphnobela) Cossmann, 1896

Extinct genus of gastropods

† Daphnobela is an extinct genus of predatory sea snails, marine gastropod molluscs in the family Fasciolariidae.

This genus was first described by Maurice Cossmann in 1896.

== Selected species ==
- D. amblia
- D. gracillima
- D. juncea
- D. junceum
- D. manti
- D. miocaenica
- D. pumila

Synonyms

- Daphnobela (Carinapex) Dall, 1924: synonym of Carinapex Dall, 1924 (original rank)
- Daphnobela minutissima (Garrett, 1873): synonym of Carinapex minutissima (Garrett, 1873)
