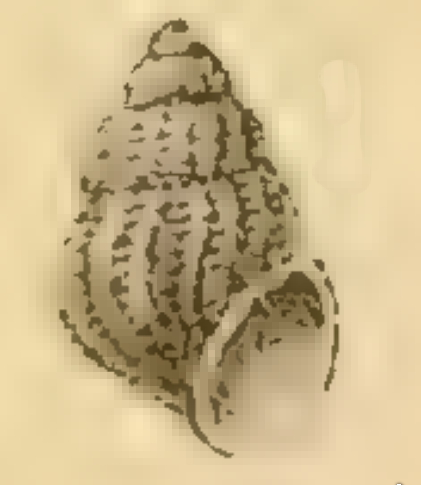
- Drawing of a shell of Alvania crystallina

Scientific classification
- Kingdom: Animalia
- Phylum: Mollusca
- Class: Gastropoda
- Subclass: Caenogastropoda
- Order: Littorinimorpha
- Superfamily: Rissooidea
- Family: Rissoidae
- Genus: Alvania
- Species: A. crystallina

Binomial name
- Alvania crystallina (Garrett, 1873)

Synonyms
- Rissoa crystallina Garrett, 1873 ·

= Alvania crystallina =

Species of gastropod

Alvania crystallina is a species of small sea snail, a marine gastropod mollusk or micromollusk in the family Rissoidae.

== Description ==
The length of the shell attains 2 mm.

(Original description) The small, white, ovate shell is thin, sub-pellucid, vitreous and shining. The spire is conical and obtuse. It contains 5 convex whorls, rounded and longitudinally ribbed. The body whorl is very large. The ribs are small and slightly oblique. They are evanescent on the lower part of the body whorl. The whole surface is covered with smaller, spiral ridges. The suture is deeply impressed. The aperture is subcircular. It is vertical and slightly angulate above. It is a little more than the third the length of the shell. The peristome is thickened. The arched columella is callous.

== Distribution ==
This species occurs in the Pacific Ocean off Hawaii
