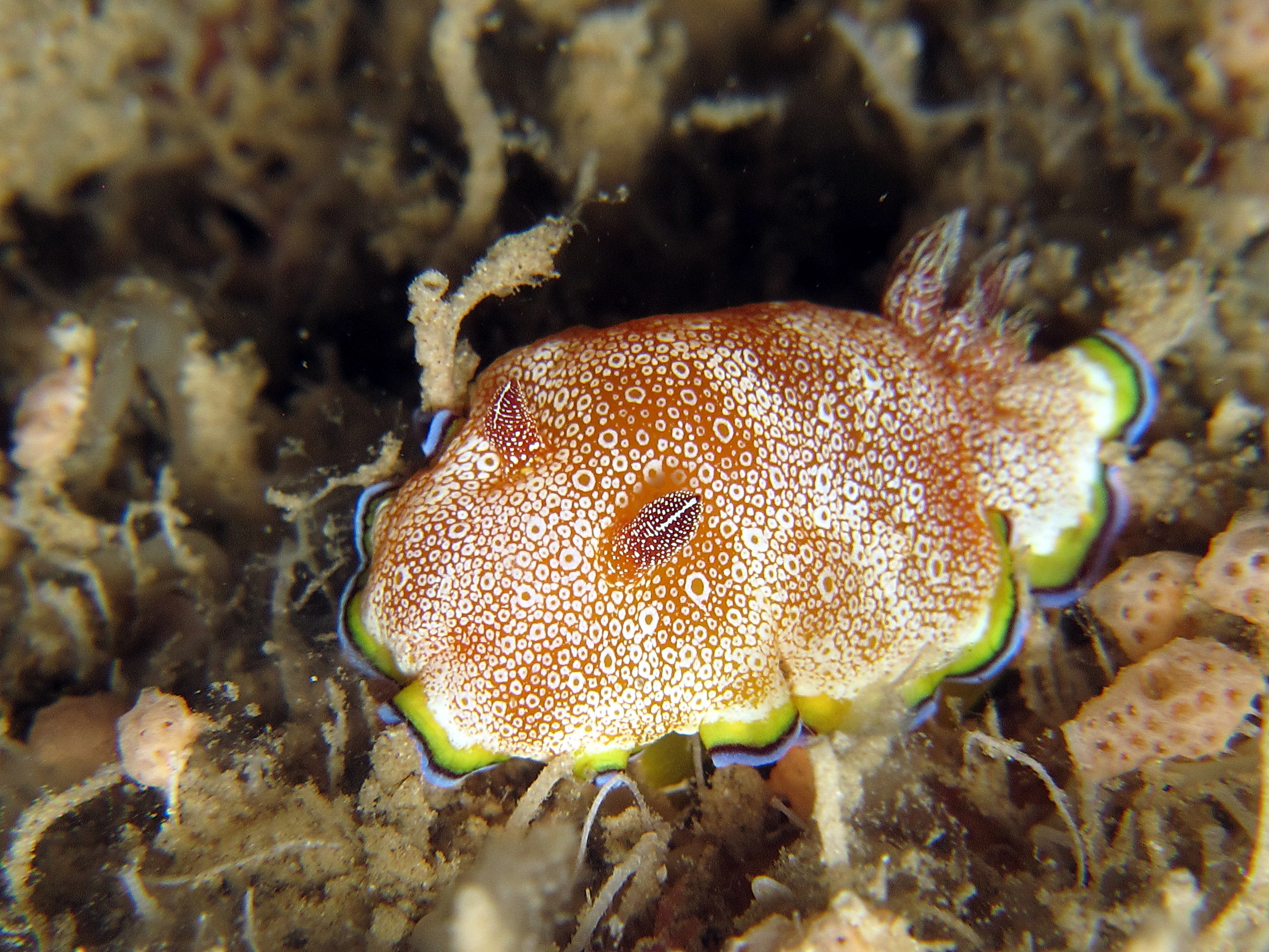

Scientific classification
- Kingdom: Animalia
- Phylum: Mollusca
- Class: Gastropoda
- Order: Nudibranchia
- Family: Chromodorididae
- Genus: Goniobranchus
- Species: G. albopunctatus

Binomial name
- Goniobranchus albopunctatus Garrett, 1879

Synonyms
- Chromodoris albopunctata (Garrett, 1879); Chromodoris sykesi Eliot, 1904

= Goniobranchus albopunctatus =

Species of gastropod

Goniobranchus albopunctatus is a species of colourful sea slug, a dorid nudibranch, a marine gastropod mollusc in the family Chromodorididae.

== Distribution ==
This marine species was described from Huahine, Society Islands, Pacific Ocean. It has been reported from Sulawesi and on the East African coast from Tanzania to South Africa and from the Marshall Islands.
