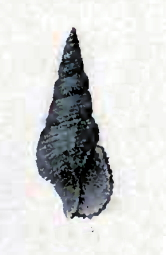
- Shell of Daphnella vitrea

Scientific classification
- Kingdom: Animalia
- Phylum: Mollusca
- Class: Gastropoda
- Subclass: Caenogastropoda
- Order: Neogastropoda
- Superfamily: Conoidea
- Family: Raphitomidae
- Genus: Daphnella
- Species: D. vitrea

Binomial name
- Daphnella vitrea Garrett, 1873

= Daphnella vitrea =

Species of gastropod

Daphnella vitrea is a species of sea snail, a marine gastropod mollusk in the family Raphitomidae.

This is a taxon inquirendum.

The variety Daphnella vitrea var. articulata Hervier, 1897 is also a taxon inquirendum.

== Description ==
The length of the shell attains 8 mm.

The thin, white shell is vitreous and subpellucid. It contains eight whorls, obtusely narrowly shouldered above, covered by fine spiral striae. The upper whorls are longitudinally ribbed. Each whorl shows two slight periodical varices. The outer lip is finely crenulated, slightly varicose externally. The sinus is large and deep.

== Distribution ==
This species occurs ioff the Paumotus, Polynesia.
