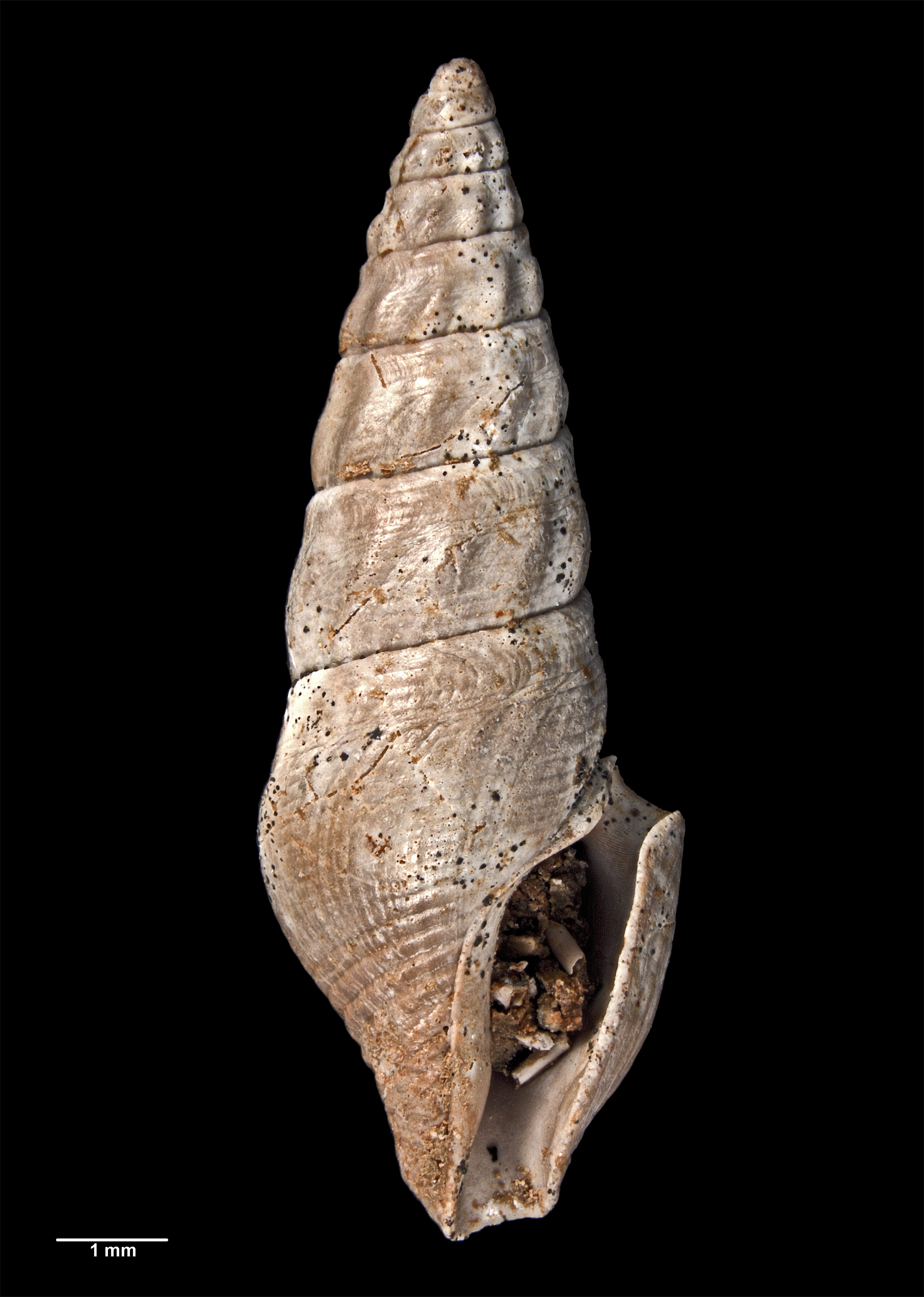
- Holotype from Auckland War Memorial Museum

Scientific classification
- Kingdom: Animalia
- Phylum: Mollusca
- Class: Gastropoda
- Subclass: Caenogastropoda
- Order: Neogastropoda
- Family: Drilliidae
- Genus: Splendrillia
- Species: †S. formosa

Binomial name
- †Splendrillia formosa A. W. B. Powell, 1944

= Splendrillia formosa =

Splendrillia formosa Temporal range: middle Miocene

Extinct species of gastropod

Splendrillia formosa is an extinct species of sea snail, a marine gastropod mollusc in the family Drilliidae. Fossils of the species date to the middle Miocene, and occur in the strata of the Otway Basin of Victoria, Australia.

== Description ==
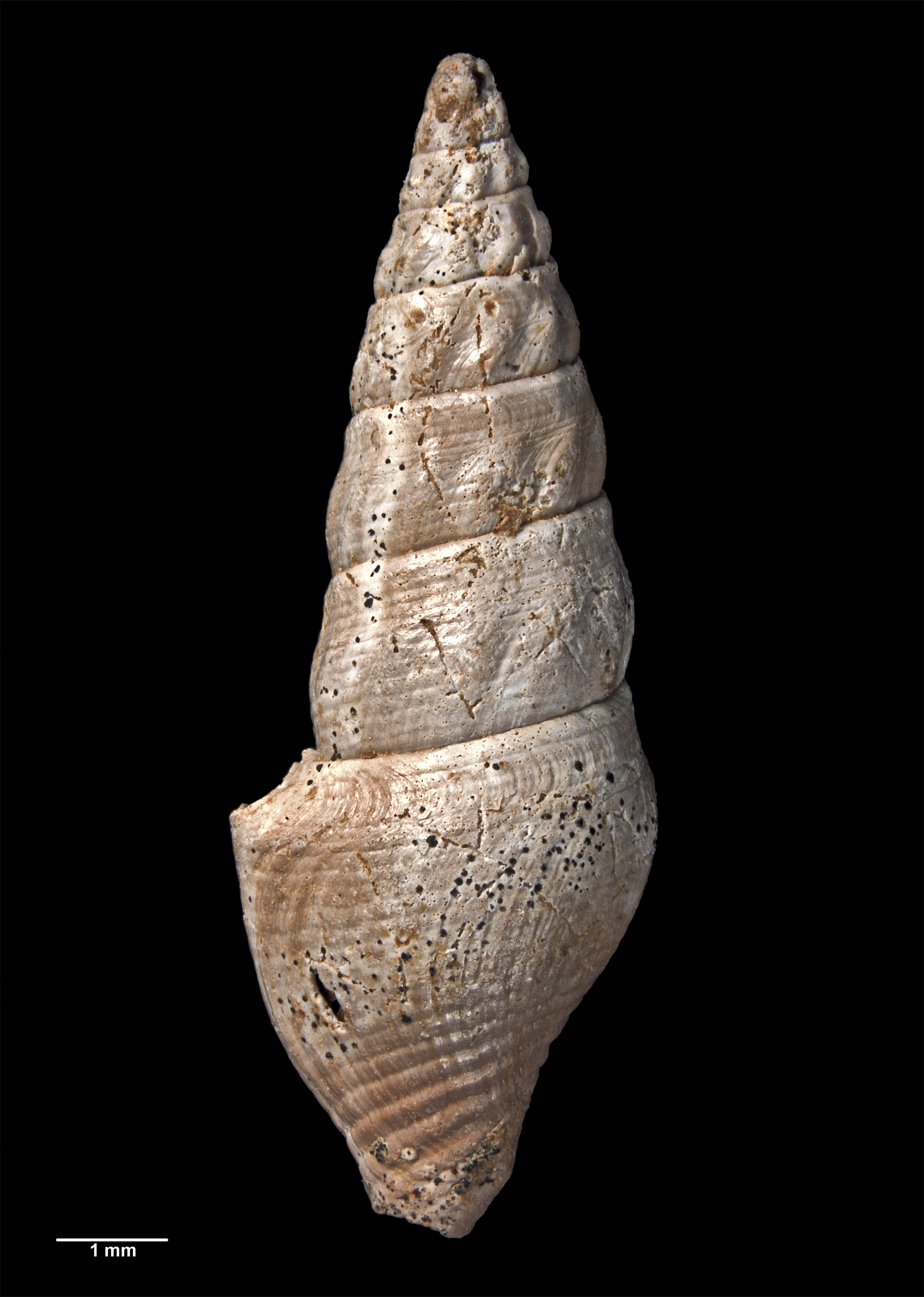
Reverse view of holotype

In the original description, Powell described the species as follows:

Shell small, slender, tall-spired, sculptured with narrowly-rounded, very oblique axials, 10-11 per whorl, obsolescent on last whorl. Surface covered with incised spirals, 12 on spire-whorls and about 26 on body-whorl, base, and neck. From the middle of the base to the anterior end the spirals become increasingly deeper and wider-spaced, cutting the surface into quite strong rounded cords. Subsutural fold weak, narrow, and flattened. Shoulder very steep, broad, and very shallow, scarcely indenting the lightly convex whorl outlines. Aperture narrow; parietal callus-pad heavy; posterior sinus deep, subtubular.

The holotype of the species measures 10.5 mm (0.41 in) in height and 3.9 mm (0.15 in) in diameter. The species' developed spiral sculpture resembles Iredalea exilis, but can be distinguished due to lacking a keeled protoconch.

== Taxonomy ==
The species was first described by A.W.B. Powell in 1944. The holotype was collected from Clifton Bank, Hamilton, Victoria, at an unknown date prior to 1944, and is held by the Auckland War Memorial Museum.

== Distribution ==
This extinct marine species dates to the middle Miocene, and occurs in the strata of the Otway Basin of Victoria, Australia, known from the Muddy Creek Formation.
