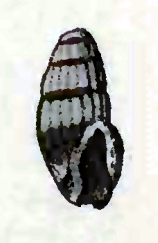
- Drawing of a shell of Iredalea pupoidea

Scientific classification
- Kingdom: Animalia
- Phylum: Mollusca
- Class: Gastropoda
- Subclass: Caenogastropoda
- Order: Neogastropoda
- Superfamily: Conoidea
- Family: Drilliidae
- Genus: Iredalea
- Species: I. pupoidea

Binomial name
- Iredalea pupoidea (H. Adams, 1872)

Synonyms
- Zafra pupoidea H. Adams, 1872 (original combination)

= Iredalea pupoidea =

Species of gastropod

Iredalea pupoidea is a species of sea snail, a marine gastropod mollusk in the family Drilliidae.

According to Gastropods.com, this species is a synonym of Haedropleura pygmaea (Dunker, R.W., 1860)

== Description ==
The length of the shell attains 7 mm, its diameter 3 mm.

The elongate-ovoid, solid shell has numerous, longitudinal, obtuse ribs. The sutures on the convex-conical spire are impressed. The shell contains 6 whorls. The anal sinus is short and wide. The narrow aperture has an oval shape. The arcuate columella is callous. The color of the shell is white, with a broad chestnut band below the periphery, and tinged with chestnut at the base.

== Distribution ==
This species occurs in the demersal zone off Queensland, Australia, and the New Hebrides.
