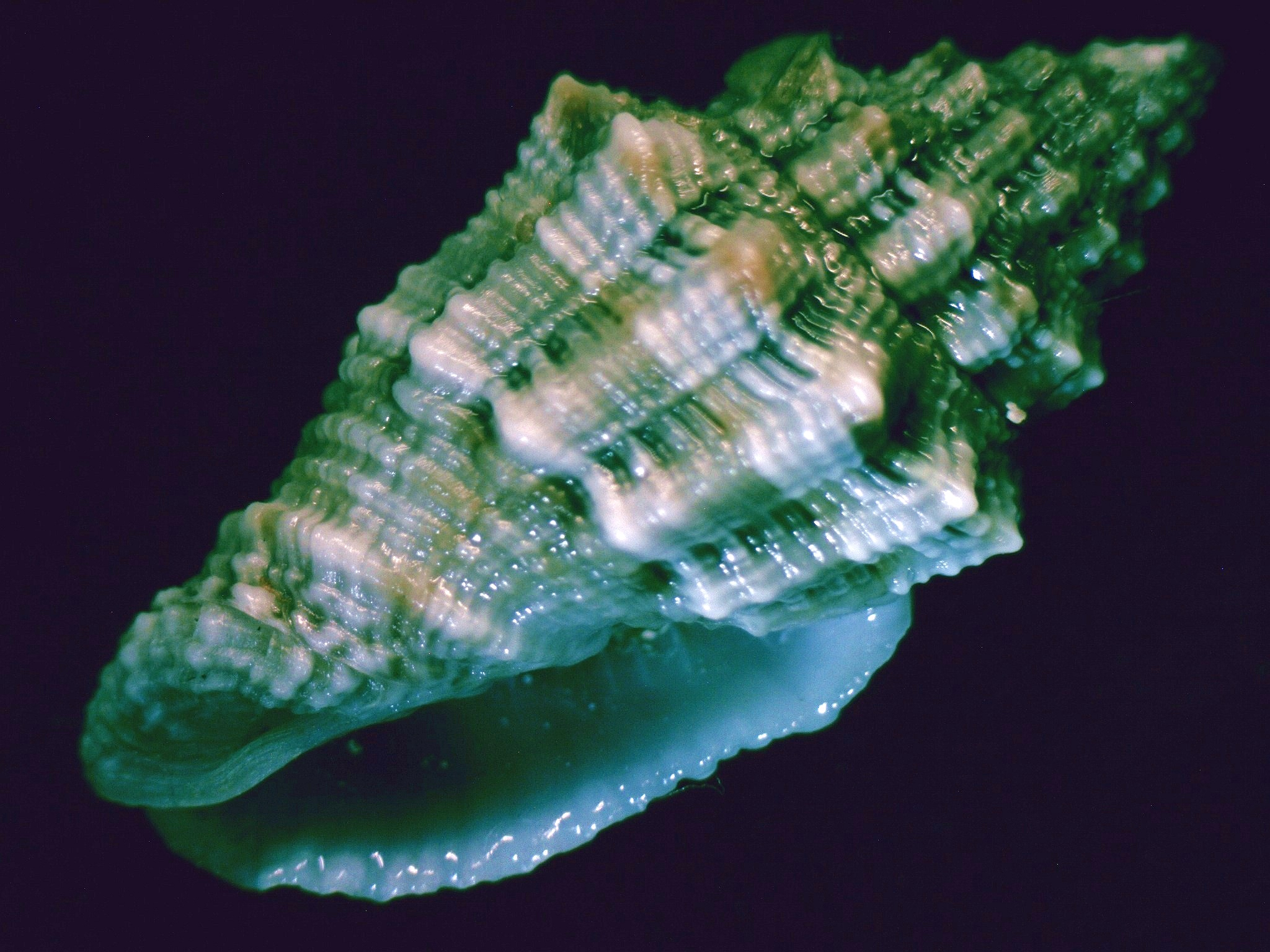

Scientific classification
- Kingdom: Animalia
- Phylum: Mollusca
- Class: Gastropoda
- Subclass: Caenogastropoda
- Order: Neogastropoda
- Superfamily: Turbinelloidea
- Family: Costellariidae
- Genus: Vexillum
- Species: V. crispum

Binomial name
- Vexillum crispum (Garrett, 1872)

Synonyms
- Costellaria crispum (A. Garrett, 1872); Mitra (Costellaria) crispa Garrett, 1872 superseded combination (original combination); Turricula crispa (Garrett, 1872) superseded combination; Vexillum (Costellaria) crispum (Garrett, 1872)

= Vexillum crispum =

Species of gastropod

Vexillum crispum is a species of small sea snail, a marine gastropod mollusk in the family Costellariidae, the ribbed miters.

== Description ==
The length of the shell varies between 14 mm and 27 mm.

(Original description) The oblong shell is subfusiform and solid. It is somewhat shining. Its color is bluish ash or yellowish ash. The acute spire is turreted and measures half the length of the shell. It contains seven or eight whorls. These are flattened and angularly shouldered above. The shell is longitudinally-ribbed. The ribs are large, slightly angular, intersected by small, flattened, transverse, more or less waved ridges. The base of the shell is contracted. The aperture has a white or flesh color. The fauces are elegantly lyrate. The violet columella has four or five plaits.

The shell is white or yellowish white, with usually a central darker band. The ribs aresharp, flexuous, somewhat distant. The interstices are foveolate. The revolving ridges being thread-like and well raised.

== Distribution ==
This marine species occurs off the Philippines, Samoa, the Fiji Islands and Japan.

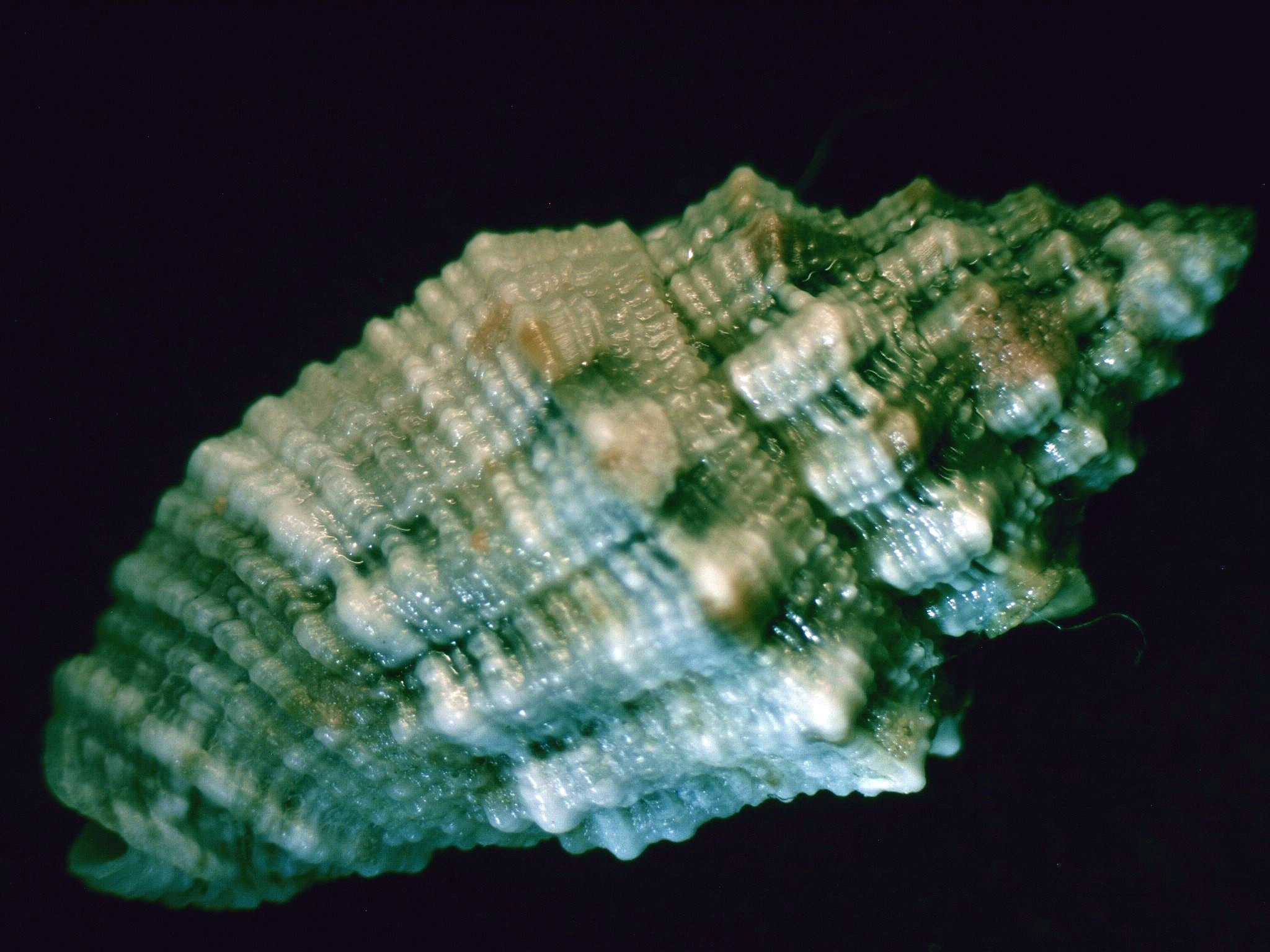
Vexillum crispum, abapertural view
