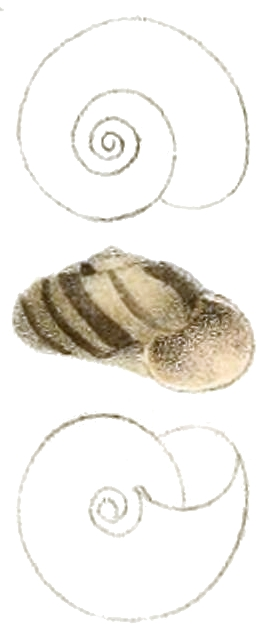
- Drawing of the shell of Sinployea decorticata.

Conservation status
- Extinct (IUCN 2.3)

Scientific classification
- Kingdom: Animalia
- Phylum: Mollusca
- Class: Gastropoda
- Order: Stylommatophora
- Family: Charopidae
- Genus: Sinployea
- Species: †S. decorticata

Binomial name
- †Sinployea decorticata (Garrett, 1872)

Synonyms
- Pitys decorticata Garrett, 1872

= Sinployea decorticata =

Extinct species of land snail

Sinployea decorticata a species of small air-breathing land snail, a terrestrial pulmonate gastropod mollusk in the family Charopidae. This species was endemic to the Cook Islands; it is now extinct.

== Shell description ==
Sinployea decorticata was originally discovered and described under the name Pitys decorticata by American naturalist Andrew Garrett in 1872.

Garrett's original text (the type description) reads as follows:

Shell subdiscoid, openly umbilicate, thin, subpellucid, cinereous, under a brownish horn-colored epidermis, adults decorticated, rarely with radiating dashes of reddish brown, arcuately ribbed, ribs lamellar, regular, rather closely set, continued on the base, interstices very finely striated; spire flatly convex; suture channeled; whorls 5, convex, slowly increasing, last one convexly declivous above, rounded beneath, obsoletely angular on the periphery; umbilicus deep, exposing the whorls, about a fourth the diameter of the shell; aperture oblique, orbicular luniform; peristome thin, simple; parietal region very thinly callosed.

The width of the shell is 4 mm. The height of the shell is 2 mm.

Type specimen are stored in the collection of Academy of Natural Sciences in Philadelphia.

== Distribution ==
Type locality is Rarotonga Island, Cook Islands.

== Habitat ==
Andrew Garrett commented on the habitat of this land snail, saying it was, "a common species found on the ground in a mountain ravine".
