= Mangelia callicredemna =

Scientific classification
- Kingdom: Animalia
- Phylum: Mollusca
- Class: Gastropoda
- Subclass: Caenogastropoda
- Order: Neogastropoda
- Superfamily: Conoidea
- Family: Mangeliidae
- Genus: Mangelia
- Species: M. callicredemna

Binomial name
- Mangelia callicredemna J.C. Melvill, 1917

Species of gastropod

Mangelia callicredemna is a species of sea snail, a marine gastropod mollusc in the family Mangeliidae.

== Description ==
The length of the shell attains 4.5 mm, its diameter 2 mm.

The white, minute shell has an ovate-fusiform shape. It contains 8 whorls, of which two vitreous whorls in the protoconch. The oblique aperture is ovate. The outer lip is thin. The columellar margin is sinuate. The siphonal canal is wide but little produced.

Akin to Ceritoturris pupiformis E.A. Smith, 1884., this small novelty occurred sparsely with it. It differs in several particulars, notably in form, being far less attenuate and cylindrical, the median whorls are all strongly uniangulate, and the body whiorl is not so lengthened, proportionately, as is that of C. pupiformis.

== Distribution ==
This marine species occurs in the Gulf of Oman.
