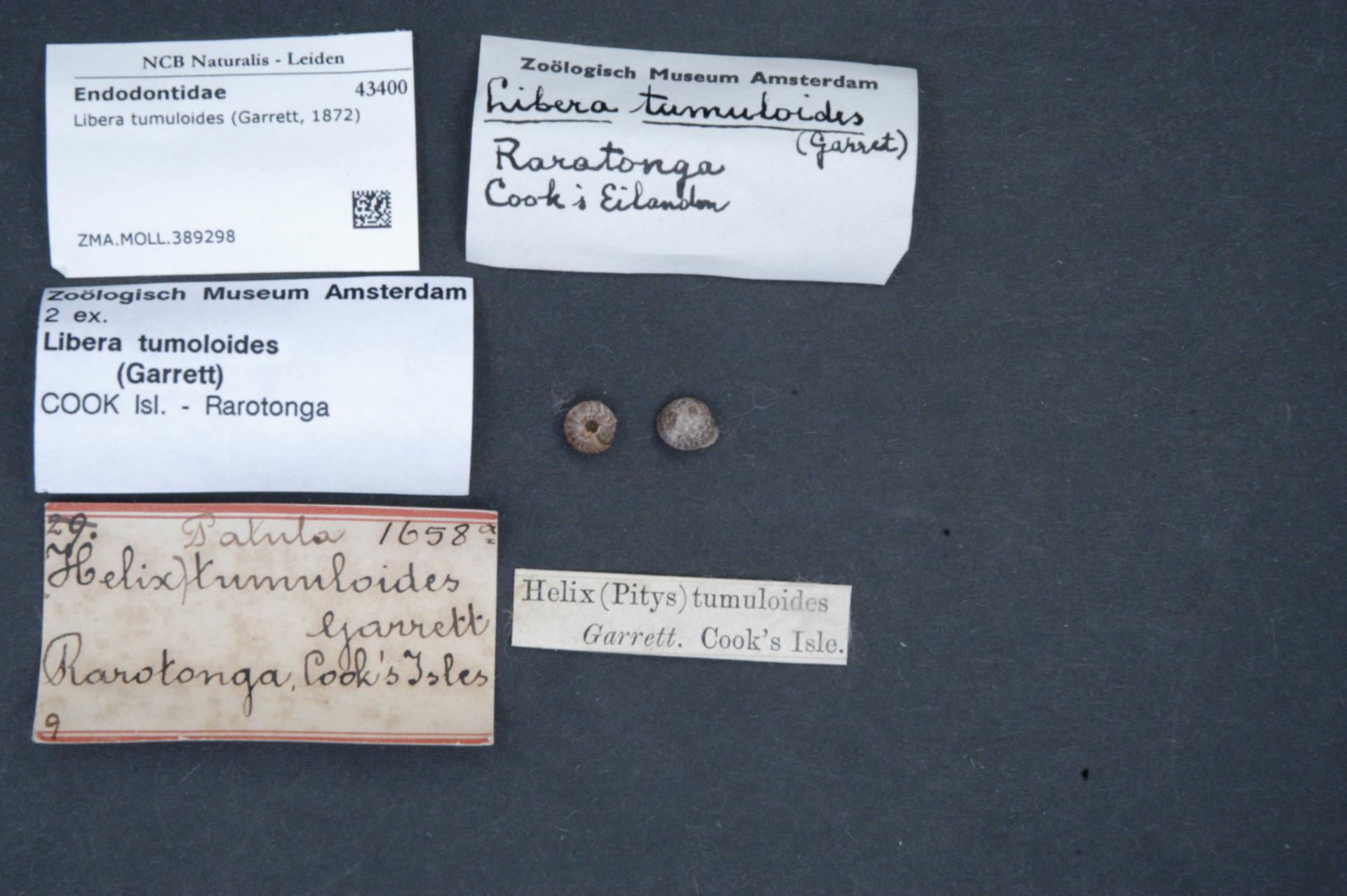
- Libera tumuloides shells

Conservation status
- Extinct (IUCN 2.3)

Scientific classification
- Kingdom: Animalia
- Phylum: Mollusca
- Class: Gastropoda
- Order: Stylommatophora
- Family: Endodontidae
- Genus: Libera
- Species: †L. tumuloides

Binomial name
- †Libera tumuloides Garrett, 1872

= Libera tumuloides =

Species of gastropod

†Libera tumuloides was a species of small air-breathing land snail, a terrestrial pulmonate gastropod mollusc in the family Endodontidae.

This species was endemic to the Cook Islands. It is now extinct.
