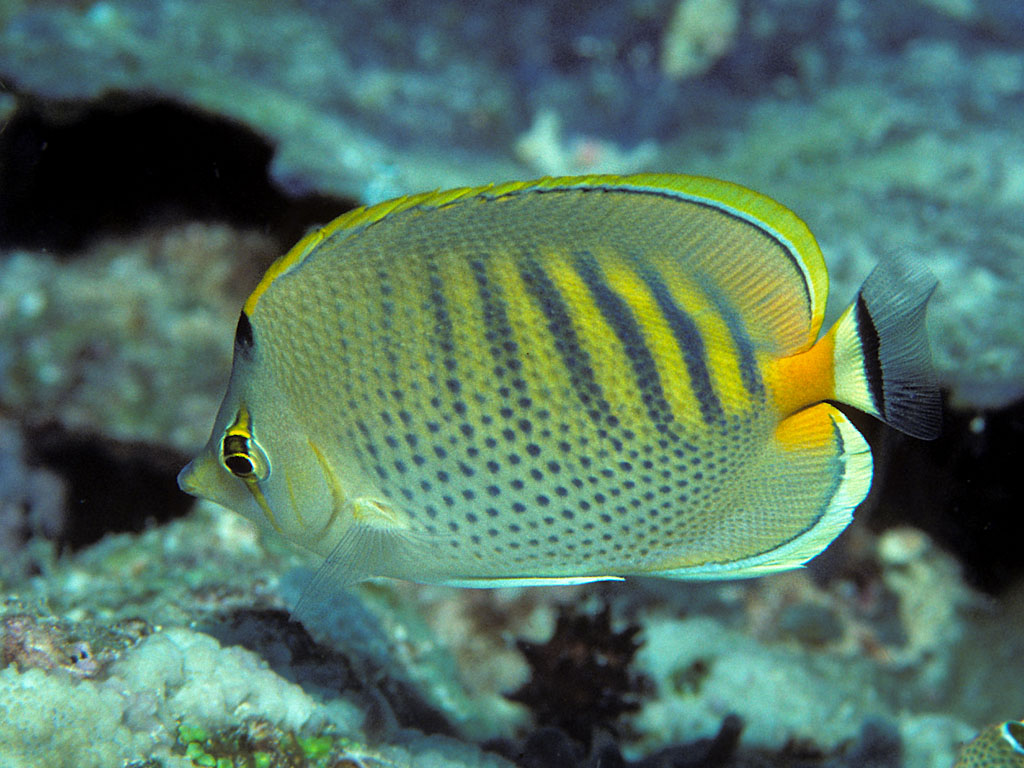

Conservation status
- Least Concern (IUCN 3.1)

Scientific classification
- Kingdom: Animalia
- Phylum: Chordata
- Class: Actinopterygii
- Division: Teleostei
- Order: Acanthuriformes
- Family: Chaetodontidae
- Genus: Chaetodon
- Subgenus: Chaetodon (Exornator)
- Species: C. punctatofasciatus

Binomial name
- Chaetodon punctatofasciatus G. Cuvier, 1831

Synonyms
- Chaetodon punctatolineatus Gronow, 1854

= Spotband butterflyfish =

Species of fish

The spot-banded butterflyfish or spotband butterflyfish (Chaetodon punctatofasciatus) is a species of marine ray-finned fish, a butterflyfish belonging to the family Chaetodontidae. It is from the western Pacific Ocean.

== Distribution ==
It is found in the Indo-West Pacific region from Christmas Island in the eastern Indian Ocean to the Line Islands, north to the Ryukyu Islands, south to the Rowley Shoals and the northern Great Barrier Reef, and throughout Micronesia. Replaced by its close relative the peppered butterflyfish (C. guttatissimus) in the Indian Ocean, these two species are sympatric from Christmas Island to Bali.

== Taxonomy ==
This is one of the members of the subgenus Exornator. With the Peppered butterflyfish it is part of a close-knit group which also includes the pebbled butterflyfish (C. multicinctus) and the sunset butterflyfish (C. pelewensis). It is suspected that these four are able to produce fertile hybrids. If the genus Chaetodon is split up, Exornator might become a subgenus of Lepidochaetodon. C. punctatofasciatus is the type species of the subgenus Exornator and was first formally described in 1831 by the French anatomist Georges Cuvier (1769–1832).

== Description ==
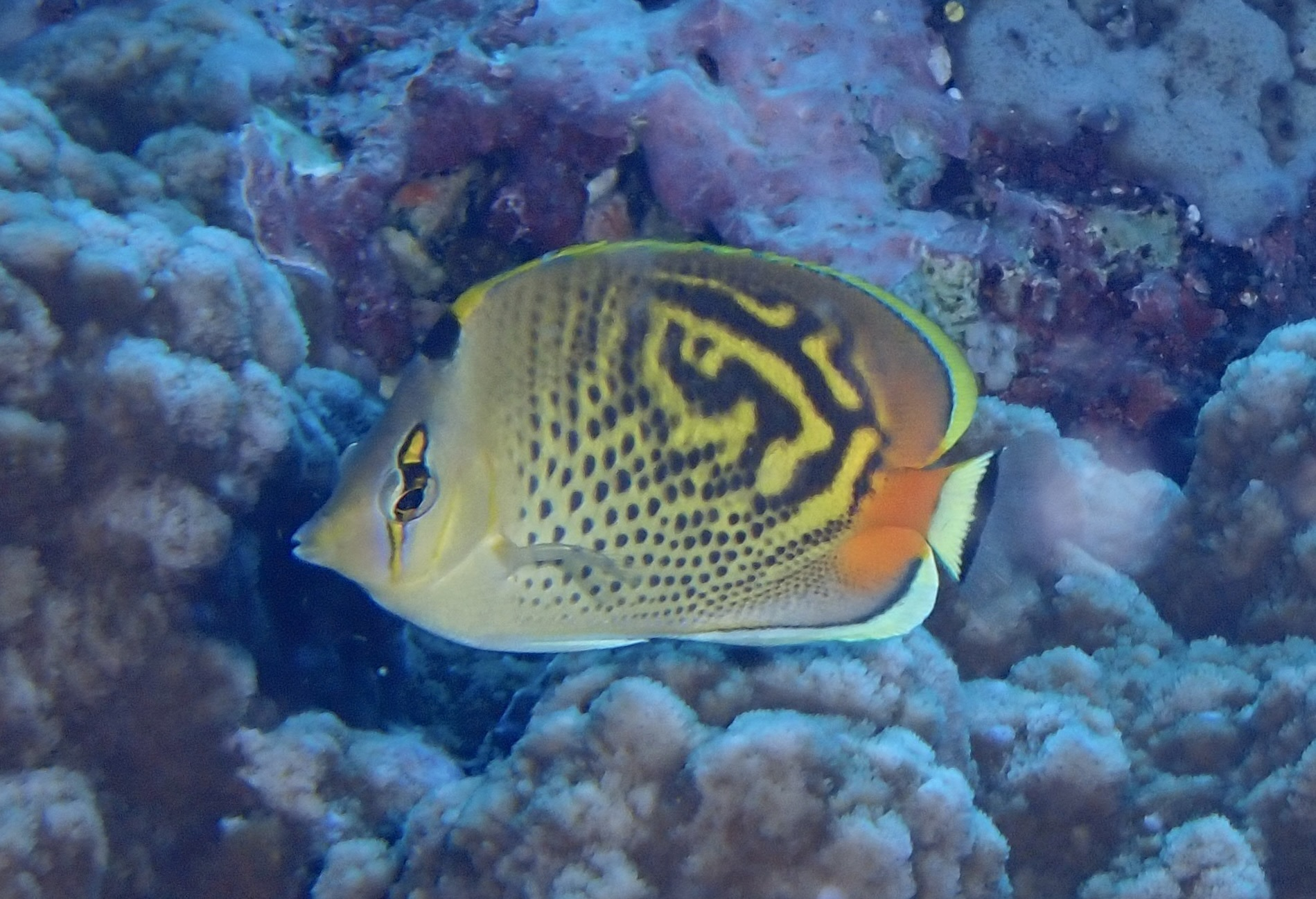
C. punctatofasciatus × C. pelewensis hybrid

The spot-banded butterflyfish grows to a maximum of 12 cm long. Its body is pale grey with close-set grey spots which are aligned in vertical bands, interspersed with yellow, on the upper sides and form horizontal rows on the lower sides. The dorsal fin has a yellow margin and there is a bright orange patch running through the caudal peduncle.

== Biology ==
It is found in coral-rich areas and clear waters of seaward and lagoon reefs. This fish feeds on filamentous algae and coral polyps and other benthic invertebrates.
