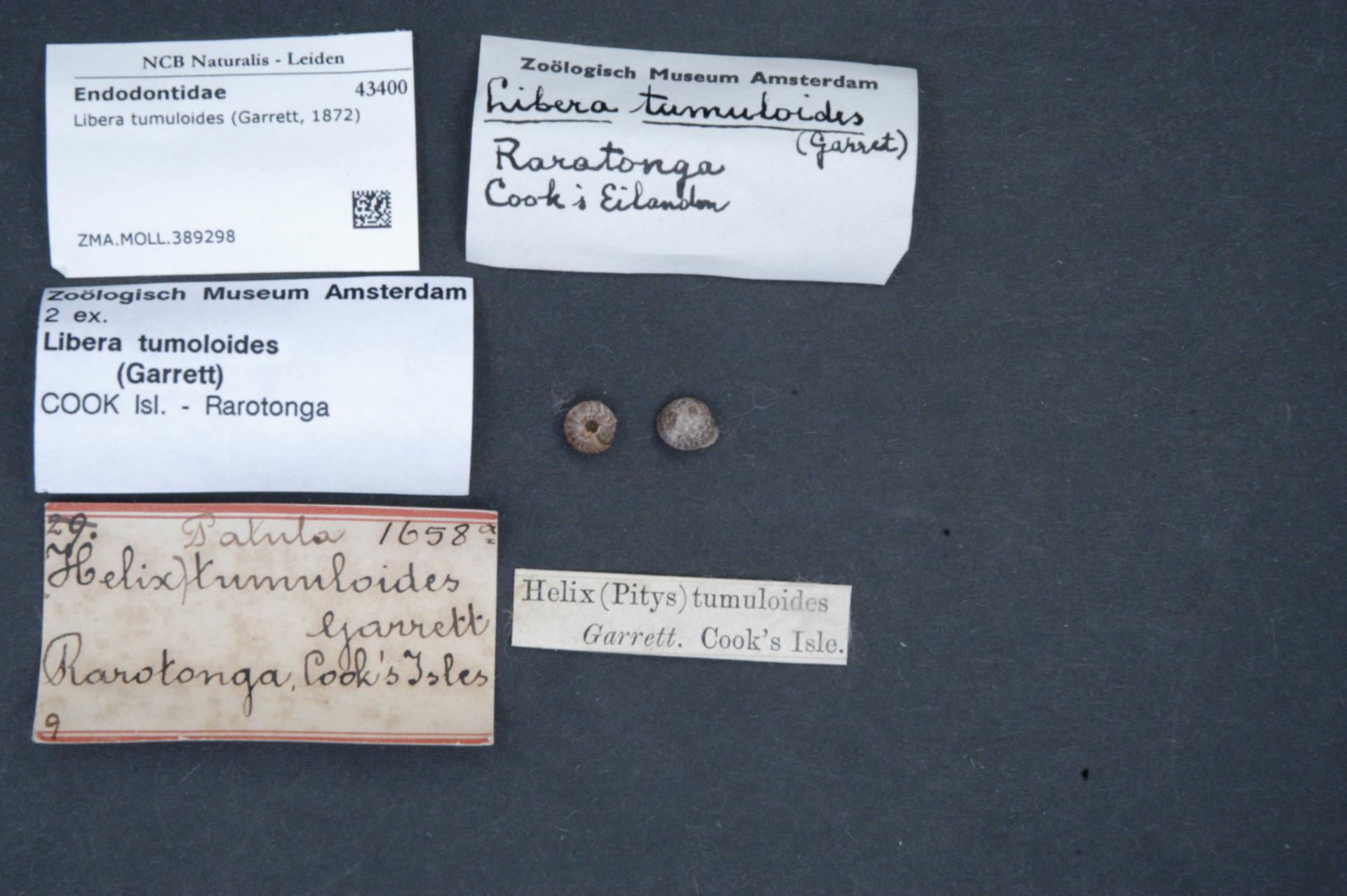
- Libera tumuloides shells

Scientific classification
- Kingdom: Animalia
- Phylum: Mollusca
- Class: Gastropoda
- Order: Stylommatophora
- Family: Endodontidae
- Genus: Libera; Garrett, 1881

Synonyms
- Garrettia Cossman, 1910 not Paetel, 1873; Garrettina Thiele, 1931; Helix (Libera) Garrett, 1881 ·

= Libera (gastropod) =

Genus of gastropods

Libera is a genus of air-breathing land snails, terrestrial pulmonate gastropod mollusks in the family Endodontidae.

Originally the genus Libera was placed within the family Charopidae.

== Species ==
Species in the genus Libera include:

- Libera bursatella (Gould, 1876)
  - Libera bursatella bursatella (Gould, 1876)
  - Libera bursatella orofenensis Solem, 1976
- Libera cavernula (Hombron & Jacquinot, 1847)
- Libera cookeana Solem, 1976
- Libera dubiosa (Ancey, 1889)
- Libera fratercula (Pease, 1867)
  - Libera fratercula fratercula (Pease, 1867)
  - Libera fratercula ratotongensis Solem, 1976
- Libera garrettiana Solem, 1976
- Libera gregaria Garret, 1884
- Libera heynemanni (Pfeiffer, 1862)
- Libera incognata Solem, 1976
- Libera kondoi Christensen, Khan & Kirch, 2018
- Libera micrasoma Solem, 1976
- Libera recedens Garret, 1884
- Libera retunsa (Pease, 1864)
- Libera spuria (Ancey, 1889)
- Libera streptaxon (Reeve, 1852)
- Libera subcavernula (Tryon, 1887) - extinct, the type species
- Libera tumuloides (Garrett, 1872) - extinct
- Libera umbilicata Solem, 1976

Synonyms

- Libera coarctata Garrett, 1884: synonym of Libera dubiosa Ancey, 1889 (invalid: junior homonym of Libera coarctata Pfeiffer, 1850)
- Libera jackquinoti (Pfeiffer, 1850): synonym of Libera cavernula (Hombron & Jacquinot, 1847)

== Shell description ==
The genus Libera was described by Andrew Garrett in 1881. Garrett's type description reads as follows:

Shell small, widely umbilicated, umbilicus (in adults) strongly constricted so as to form a cavernous or pouch-like cavity; whorls 7-9, costulate or striate, last one angulata or carinate, rarely rounded; aperture subrhomboidal or securiform; peristome thin, simple, straight; parietal region with one or two, and the palate with (rarely without) two or three, internal laminae; columella emarginate and furnished with a spiral fold.

== Life cycle ==
These snails lay their eggs into the umbilicus of their own shells.
