= Vexillum flexicostatum =

Scientific classification
- Kingdom: Animalia
- Phylum: Mollusca
- Class: Gastropoda
- Subclass: Caenogastropoda
- Order: Neogastropoda
- Superfamily: Turbinelloidea
- Family: Costellariidae
- Genus: Vexillum
- Species: V. flexicostatum

Binomial name
- Vexillum flexicostatum (Garrett, 1880)

Synonyms
- Turricula flexicostata Garrett, 1880 (original combination); Vexillum (Costellaria) flexicostatum (Garrett, 1880)

Species of gastropod

Vexillum flexicostatum is a species of small sea snail, marine gastropod mollusk in the family Costellariidae, the ribbed miters.

== Description ==
The length of the shell attains 15 mm, its diameter 5 mm.

(Original description) The shell is acuminately turreted and rather slender. It is ashy-brown, with a single narrow pale zone on the upper portion of the body whorl, which is continued upward on the middle of the whorls of the spire. The shell contains 9 convex whorls, longitudinally plicately ribbed. The ribs are narrow, smooth and flexuous. The interstices show rather close, transverse incised lines. The base is contracted, slightly produced and somewhat twisted. The aperture measures less than half the length of the shell. It is brownish with a whitish zone. The columella has four plaits.

== Distribution ==
This marine species occurs off the Philippines and Vanuatu.
