= Sinployea otareae =

Conservation status
- Extinct (IUCN 2.3)

Scientific classification
- Kingdom: Animalia
- Phylum: Mollusca
- Class: Gastropoda
- Order: Stylommatophora
- Family: Charopidae
- Genus: Sinployea
- Species: †S. otareae

Binomial name
- †Sinployea otareae Garrett, 1872

Species of gastropod

Sinployea otareae was a species of small air-breathing land snail, a terrestrial pulmonate gastropod mollusc in the family Charopidae. This species was endemic to the Cook Islands; it is now extinct.
