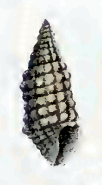
- Original image of a shell of Carinapex papillosa

Scientific classification
- Kingdom: Animalia
- Phylum: Mollusca
- Class: Gastropoda
- Subclass: Caenogastropoda
- Order: Neogastropoda
- Superfamily: Conoidea
- Family: Horaiclavidae
- Genus: Carinapex
- Species: C. papillosa

Binomial name
- Carinapex papillosa (Garrett, 1873)

Synonyms
- Ceritoturris papillosa (Garrett, 1873); Drillia papillosa Garrett, 1873 (original combination); Glyphostoma dialitha (Melvill & Standen, 1896); Mangilia dialitha Melvill, J.C. & R. Standen, 1897, "1896"

= Carinapex papillosa =

Species of gastropod

Carinapex papillosa is a species of sea snail, a marine gastropod mollusk in the family Horaiclavidae.

It was previously included within the family Turridae.

== Description ==
The length of the shell varies between 3.5 mm and 6 mm.

(Original description) The small, solid shell has an elongate-oblong shape. The spire is moderately elevated, yellowish-white. It contains 8 convex whorls, constricted beneath the suture and spirally granulose. The granules are rather large, three rows on the whorls of the spire, the lower one obsolete. The base is contracted, spirally ridged and produced into a short, obtuse, open siphonal canal. The aperture is sub-ovate, small, nearly a third the length of the shell. The posterior sinus is large, deep, and rounded. The peristome is rather acute, slightly sinuous near the base. The columella is smooth, callous and nearly vertical.

== Distribution ==
This marine species occurs off Hawaii and the Fiji Islands.
