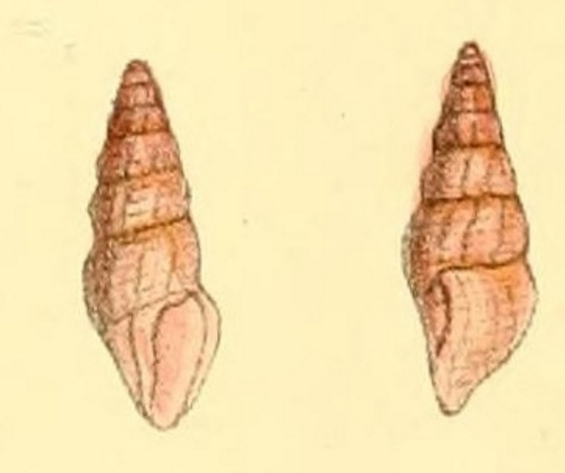
- Original image of a shell of Ceritoturris suavis

Scientific classification
- Kingdom: Animalia
- Phylum: Mollusca
- Class: Gastropoda
- Subclass: Caenogastropoda
- Order: Neogastropoda
- Superfamily: Conoidea
- Family: Horaiclavidae
- Genus: Ceritoturris
- Species: C. suavis

Binomial name
- Ceritoturris suavis (Hervier, 1896)

Synonyms
- Drillia suavis Hervier, 1896 (original combination)

= Ceritoturris suavis =

Species of gastropod

Ceritoturris suavis is a species of sea snail, a marine gastropod mollusk in the family Horaiclavidae.

== Distribution ==
This marine species occurs off the Loyalty Islands. .
