= Iredalea adenensis =

Scientific classification
- Kingdom: Animalia
- Phylum: Mollusca
- Class: Gastropoda
- Subclass: Caenogastropoda
- Order: Neogastropoda
- Superfamily: Conoidea
- Family: Drilliidae
- Genus: Iredalea
- Species: I. adenensis

Binomial name
- Iredalea adenensis Morassi & Bonfitto, 2013

Species of gastropod

Iredalea adenensis is a species of sea snail, a marine gastropod mollusc in the family Drilliidae.

== Distribution ==
This marine species occurs in the Gulf of Aden.
