= Ceritoturris nataliae =

Scientific classification
- Kingdom: Animalia
- Phylum: Mollusca
- Class: Gastropoda
- Subclass: Caenogastropoda
- Order: Neogastropoda
- Superfamily: Conoidea
- Family: Horaiclavidae
- Genus: Ceritoturris
- Species: C. nataliae

Binomial name
- Ceritoturris nataliae Kilburn, 1988

Species of gastropod

Ceritoturris nataliae is a species of sea snail, a marine gastropod mollusk in the family Horaiclavidae.

It was formerly included within the subfamily Crassispirinae of the family Turridae.

== Description ==
The length of the shell attains 5.2 mm, its diameter is 1.9 mm.

== Distribution ==
This marine species was found on the continental shelf of Natal and Zululand, South Africa at depths between 50 m and 90 m.
