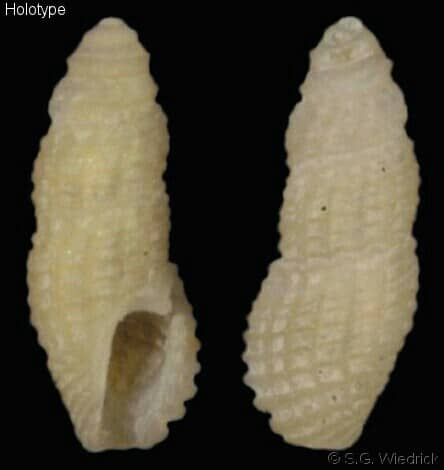
- Holotype of Carinapex mooreorum by Wiedrick, 2015

Scientific classification
- Kingdom: Animalia
- Phylum: Mollusca
- Class: Gastropoda
- Subclass: Caenogastropoda
- Order: Neogastropoda
- Family: Horaiclavidae
- Genus: Carinapex
- Species: C. mooreorum

Binomial name
- Carinapex mooreorum Wiedrick, 2015

= Carinapex mooreorum =

Species of gastropod

Carinapex mooreorum is a species of sea snail, a marine gastropod mollusk belonging to the family Horaiclavidae and the subclass Caenogastropoda, which includes the apple snails and periwinkles. The mollusk was first described by Wienrick in 2015 off the coast of Hawaii.

== Description ==
The length of the shell attains between 0 - 2.1 mm (0.1 inches). Its shell is characterized by a minute sized distinctive truncated pyramid-like shape, featuring a strong beaded ribbing structure on the early whorls while having a blunt apex and an ovate aperture with a lip that bulges outwards. The coloration of this species is typically cream-white in color in every region it lives in.

== Distribution and habitat ==
This marine species of sea snails are found in the Central Pacific Ocean. As mentioned before, they can also be found in New Caledonia, Hawaii and Indonesia, in which they are documented from.

Carinapex mooreorum mollusks are known to typically live in inhabit large shallow tidal pools within the neritic zone, specifically rubble-bottomed pools.
