= Daphnobela juncea =

Daphnobela juncea Temporal range: Eocene

Scientific classification
- Domain: Eukaryota
- Kingdom: Animalia
- Phylum: Mollusca
- Class: Gastropoda
- Subclass: Caenogastropoda
- Order: Neogastropoda
- Family: Fasciolariidae
- Genus: †Daphnobela
- Species: †D. juncea

Binomial name
- †Daphnobela juncea Solander in Brander, 1766

Extinct species of gastropod

Daphnobela juncea is an extinct species of fossil predatory sea snail, a marine gastropod mollusc in the family Fasciolariidae. This species lived in the Eocene.
