= List of non-marine molluscs of the Cook Islands =

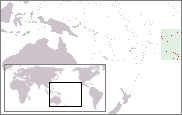
Location of the Cook Islands

The non-marine molluscs of Cook Islands are a part of the molluscan fauna of the Cook Islands. There are 14 species of land snails listed as extinct in 2009 IUCN Red List, and 48 species of land gastropods.

== Land gastropods ==
Assimineidae

- Atropis rarotongana Brook, 2010 - endemic

Endodontidae

- Minidonta aroa Brook, 2010 - endemic
- Minidonta arorangi Brook, 2010 - endemic
- Minidonta iota Brook, 2010 - endemic
- Minidonta kavera Brook, 2010 - endemic
- Minidonta matavera Brook, 2010 - endemic
- Minidonta ngatangiia Brook, 2010 - endemic
- Minidonta pue Brook, 2010 - endemic
- Minidonta rutaki Brook, 2010 - endemic
- Thaumatodon multilamellata Garrett, 1887 - extinct

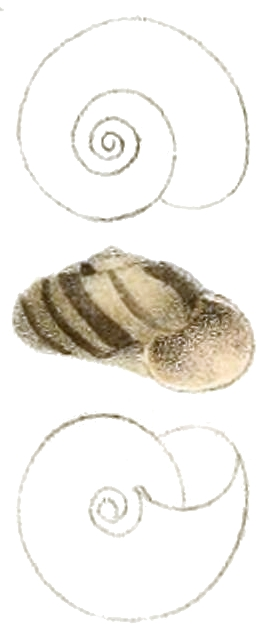
Drawing of the shell of an extinct snail Sinployea decorticata.

Charopidae

- Libera fratercula fratercula (Pease)
- Libera subcavernula Tryon, 1887 - extinct
- Libera tumuloides Garrett, 1872 - extinct
- Mautodontha unilamellata Garrett, 1884 - extinct
- Mautodontha zebrina - extinct
- Sinployea atiensis
- Sinployea andrewi
- Sinployea avanaensis
- Sinployea canalis Garrett, 1872 - extinct
- Sinployea decorticata (Garrett, 1872) - extinct
- Sinployea harveyensis Garrett, 1872 - extinct
- Sinployea muri Brook, 2010 - endemic
- Sinployea otareae Garrett, 1872 - extinct
- Sinployea planospira Garrett, 1872 - extinct
- Sinployea proxima Garrett, 1872 - extinct
- Sinployea rudis Garrett, 1872 - extinct
- Sinployea taipara Brook, 2010 - endemic
- Sinployea tenuicostata Garrett, 1872 - extinct
- Sinployea titikaveka Brook, 2010 - endemic
- Sinployea tupapa Brook, 2010 - endemic
- Sinployea youngi Garrett, 1872 - extinct

Partulidae

- Partula assimilis - endemic
- Partula hyalina

Vertiginidae

- Nesopupa rarotonga Brook, 2010 - endemic

== Freshwater bivalves ==
The status of freshwater bivalves in this area is currently unknown.

== See also ==
- List of non-marine molluscs of American Samoa
- List of non-marine molluscs of New Zealand
