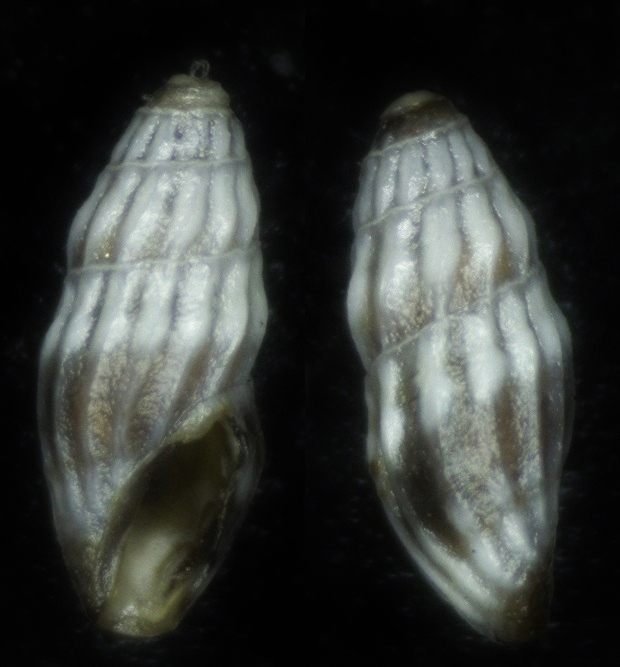
- Two views of a shell of Iredalea balteata

Scientific classification
- Kingdom: Animalia
- Phylum: Mollusca
- Class: Gastropoda
- Subclass: Caenogastropoda
- Order: Neogastropoda
- Superfamily: Conoidea
- Family: Drilliidae
- Genus: Iredalea
- Species: I. balteata

Binomial name
- Iredalea balteata (Gould, A.A., 1860)

Synonyms
- Columbella (Anachis) balteata A. Gould, 1860 (superseded combination); Columbella balteata A. Gould, 1860 (superseded combination)

= Iredalea balteata =

Species of gastropod

Iredalea balteata is a species of sea snail, a marine gastropod mollusk in the family Drilliidae. This species was first described by Augustus Addison Gould in 1860, who was an American malacologist.

== Description ==
The length of the shell attains 4 mm.

The Iredalea balteata has a small, elongated shell that is a length of approximately 4 millimeters.

The original description in Latin read:

The shell is small, rhombic, elongated, and glossy, with a straw-yellow color and a tawny stripe. It has seven whorls. The first three whorls are smooth, while the remaining whorls are marked with fine, lyre-like grooves and a line just below the suture. The areas between these grooves have crosswise striations. The aperture is narrowly crescent-shaped, and the lip is simple.

The shell is slender and fusiform with ribs and fine spiral striations. It is typically light in color with darker bands, which is why it is named "balteata" which translates to "belted" in Latin.

== Distribution ==
This marine species occurs off the Philippines and off Southern Madagascar. It is found in marine environments and inhabits sandy or muddy substrates at varying depths. It likely preys on small invertebrates in these environments.
