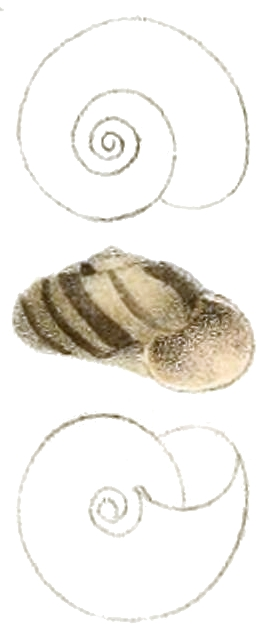
- Drawing of the shell of Sinployea decorticata.

Scientific classification
- Kingdom: Animalia
- Phylum: Mollusca
- Class: Gastropoda
- Order: Stylommatophora
- Family: Charopidae
- Subfamily: Charopinae
- Genus: Sinployea; Solem, 1983

= Sinployea =

Genus of gastropods

Sinployea is a genus of small air-breathing land snails, terrestrial pulmonate gastropod mollusks in the family Charopidae.

== Species ==
There are 19 known Sinployea species:

- Sinployea atiensis
- Sinployea andrewi
- Sinployea avanaensis
- Sinployea canalis - extinct
- Sinployea decorticata - extinct
- Sinployea ellicensis
- Sinployea harveyensis - extinct
- Sinployea kusaieana
- Sinployea nissani (Dell, 1955)
- Sinployea otareae - extinct
- Sinployea peasei Solem, 1983 - the type species
- Sinployea pitcairnensis
- Sinployea planospira - extinct
- Sinployea proxima - extinct
- Sinployea pseudovicaria
- Sinployea rotumana
- Sinployea rudis - extinct
- Sinployea tenuicostata - extinct
- Sinployea youngi - extinct
