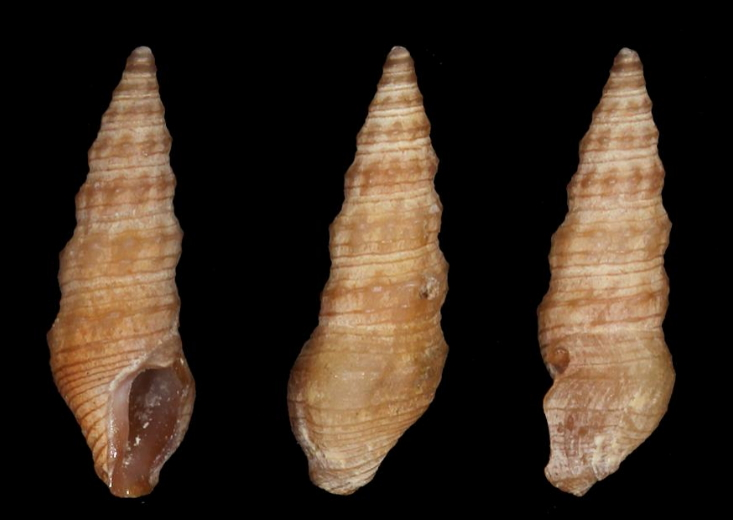
- Shell of Ceritoturris bittium (holotype at the Smithsonian Institution)

Scientific classification
- Kingdom: Animalia
- Phylum: Mollusca
- Class: Gastropoda
- Subclass: Caenogastropoda
- Order: Neogastropoda
- Superfamily: Conoidea
- Family: Horaiclavidae
- Genus: Ceritoturris
- Species: C. bittium

Binomial name
- Ceritoturris bittium (Dall, 1924)

Synonyms
- Crassispira bittium Dall, 1924 (original combination)

= Ceritoturris bittium =

Species of gastropod

Ceritoturris bittium is a species of sea snail, a marine gastropod mollusk in the family Horaiclavidae.

It was formerly included within the family Pseudomelatomidae.

== Description ==
The length of the shell attains 7 mm.

(Original description) The minute shell has a blunt protoconch. The second whorl shows a peripheral keel. The seven subsequent whorls are moderately rounded, axially and spirally sculptured whorls. The siphonal canal is almost obsolete.

== Distribution ==
This marine species occurs off Hawaii.
