= Carinapex albarnesi =

Scientific classification
- Kingdom: Animalia
- Phylum: Mollusca
- Class: Gastropoda
- Subclass: Caenogastropoda
- Order: Neogastropoda
- Superfamily: Conoidea
- Family: Horaiclavidae
- Genus: Carinapex
- Species: C. albarnesi

Binomial name
- Carinapex albarnesi Wiedrick, 2015

Species of sea snail

Carinapex albarnesi is a species of sea snails, a marine gastropod mollusc in the family Horaiclavidae.

== Description ==
The length of the shell attains 4.8 mm.

== Distribution ==
This marine species occurs off Japan, Taiwan, and the Philippines.
