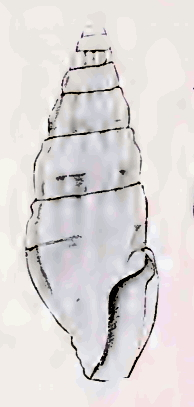
- Original image of a shell of Iredalea subtropicalis

Scientific classification
- Kingdom: Animalia
- Phylum: Mollusca
- Class: Gastropoda
- Subclass: Caenogastropoda
- Order: Neogastropoda
- Superfamily: Conoidea
- Family: Drilliidae
- Genus: Iredalea
- Species: I. subtropicalis

Binomial name
- Iredalea subtropicalis W. R. B. Oliver, 1915

Synonyms
- Clavus (Iredalea) subtropicalis (Oliver, 1915)

= Iredalea subtropicalis =

Species of gastropod

Iredalea subtropicalis is a species of sea snail, a marine gastropod mollusk in the family Drilliidae.

== Description ==
The length of an adult shell varies between 4.5 mm and 6 mm; its diameter 2.2 mm.

(Original description) The narrow, fusiform shell is truncated anteriorly. The aperture measures one-third the length of the shell. The shell contains 9 whorls, of which the protoconch forms four. The whorls are flatly rounded and with an impressed suture. The smooth protoconch is sinusigera in form, the exposed portion of its lower lip concave. The aperture is narrow oblong, obliquely angled behind, truncated in front. The outer lip is thick and smooth within. The anal sinus is deep, separated from the body whorl by a thick callous ridge. Columella smooth within. The siphonal canal is short and wide. Sculpture : The shell shows regular low axial ridges, about 15 on the body whorl, slightly constricted at their upper ends near the suture. The ridges extend on to the base of the shell, which at its anterior end has 4 oblique low ridges. The entire surface of shell is smooth and shining. The colour of the protoconch is dark yellow. The shell is white, with a faint brown band, dark in patches, along the lower edge of the whorls, but not reaching the outer lip, where, at its anterior end, two narrow brown bands are very faintly indicated.

== Distribution ==
This species occurs in the demersal zone of the Pacific Ocean off Queensland, Australia, New Zealand, Easter Island and the Kermadec Islands.
