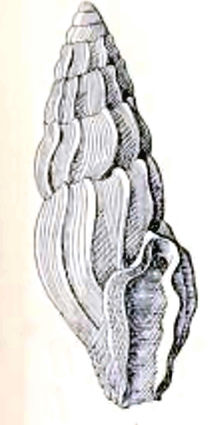
- Apertural view of a shell of Iredalea macleayi

Scientific classification
- Kingdom: Animalia
- Phylum: Mollusca
- Class: Gastropoda
- Subclass: Caenogastropoda
- Order: Neogastropoda
- Superfamily: Conoidea
- Family: Drilliidae
- Genus: Iredalea
- Species: I. macleayi

Binomial name
- Iredalea macleayi (Brazier, 1876)

Synonyms
- Clathurella macleayi Brazier, 1876 (basionym); Defrancia macleayi (Brazier, 1876)

= Iredalea macleayi =

Species of gastropod

Iredalea macleayi is a species of sea snail, a marine gastropod mollusk in the family Drilliidae.

== Distribution ==
This species occurs in the demersal zone off Queensland, Australia, New Guinea and Indonesia.
