= Daphnobela miocaenica =

Daphnobela miocaenica Temporal range: Miocene

Scientific classification
- Kingdom: Animalia
- Phylum: Mollusca
- Class: Gastropoda
- Subclass: Caenogastropoda
- Order: Neogastropoda
- Family: Fasciolariidae
- Genus: †Daphnobela
- Species: †D. miocaenica

Binomial name
- †Daphnobela miocaenica Gürs, 2003

Extinct species of gastropod

† Daphnobela miocaenica is an extinct species of predatory sea snail in the family Fasciolariidae. Fossils of this animal date to the Miocene. This species was first described in 2003.
