= Carinapex alisonkayae =

Scientific classification
- Kingdom: Animalia
- Phylum: Mollusca
- Class: Gastropoda
- Subclass: Caenogastropoda
- Order: Neogastropoda
- Superfamily: Conoidea
- Family: Horaiclavidae
- Genus: Carinapex
- Species: C. alisonkayae

Binomial name
- Carinapex alisonkayae Wiedrick, 2015

Species of gastropod

Carinapex alisonkayae is a species of sea snail, a marine gastropod mollusk in the family Horaiclavidae.

== Description ==
The length of the shell attains 2.7 mm.

== Distribution ==
This marine species occurs in the Red Sea and off Hawaii.
