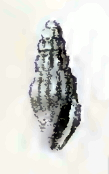
- Original image of a shell of Iredalea thalycra

Scientific classification
- Kingdom: Animalia
- Phylum: Mollusca
- Class: Gastropoda
- Subclass: Caenogastropoda
- Order: Neogastropoda
- Superfamily: Conoidea
- Family: Drilliidae
- Genus: Iredalea
- Species: I. thalycra

Binomial name
- Iredalea thalycra (Melvill, J.C. & R. Standen, 1897, "1896")

Synonyms
- Mangilia thalycra Melvill, J.C. & R. Standen, 1897, "1896" (original combination)

= Iredalea thalycra =

Species of gastropod

Iredalea thalycra is a species of sea snail, a marine gastropod mollusk in the family Drilliidae.

== Description ==
The length of the shell attains 6 mm, its diameter 1.75 mm.

A small brightly banded shell. Its colour is white, banded with ochre. The shell contains 7 gradate whorls, longitudinally stoutly ribbed. The aperture is oblong. The outer lip is slightly thickened. The columella is ochre-tinged plain.

== Distribution ==
This marine species occurs off the Loyalty Islands
