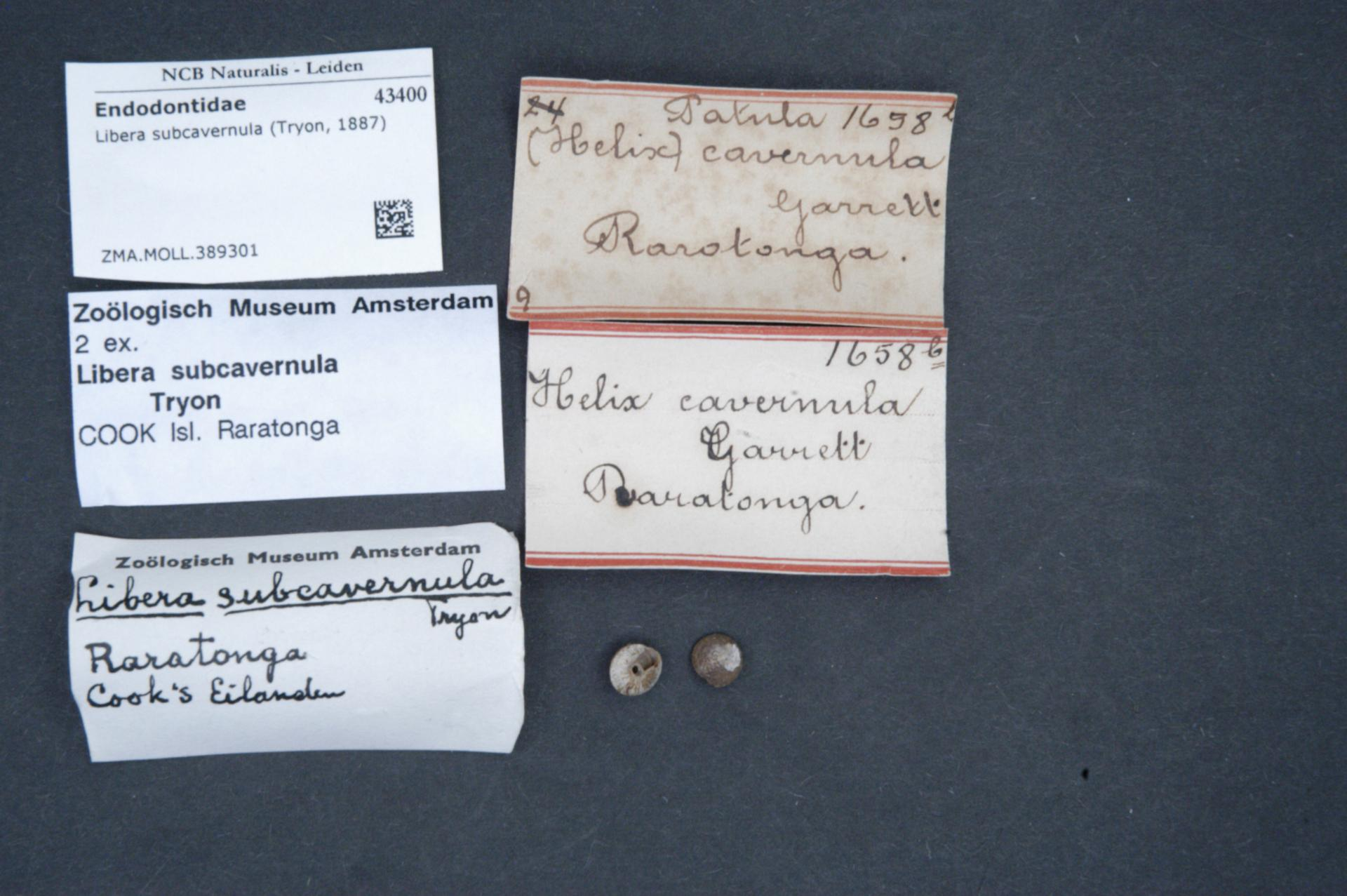
- Libera subcavernula shells

Conservation status
- Extinct (IUCN 2.3)

Scientific classification
- Kingdom: Animalia
- Phylum: Mollusca
- Class: Gastropoda
- Order: Stylommatophora
- Family: Endodontidae
- Genus: Libera
- Species: †L. subcavernula

Binomial name
- †Libera subcavernula Tryon, 1887

= Libera subcavernula =

Species of gastropod

Libera subcavernula was a species of small air-breathing land snail, a terrestrial pulmonate gastropod mollusc in the family Endodontidae.

This species was endemic to the Cook Islands. It is now extinct.
