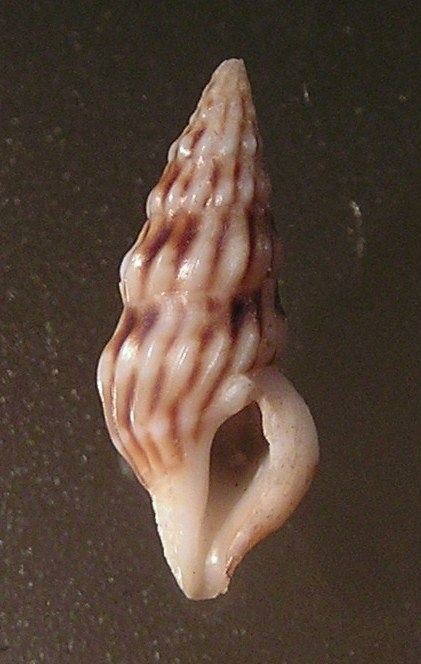

Scientific classification
- Kingdom: Animalia
- Phylum: Mollusca
- Class: Gastropoda
- Subclass: Caenogastropoda
- Order: Neogastropoda
- Superfamily: Conoidea
- Family: Drilliidae
- Genus: Iredalea
- Species: I. inclinata

Binomial name
- Iredalea inclinata (Sowerby III, 1893)

Synonyms
- Clavus inclinata (Sowerby III, 1893); Drillia inclinata (Sowerby III, 1893); Pleurotoma inclinata Sowerby III, 1893 (basionym); Tylotiella inclinata (Sowerby III, 1893)

= Iredalea inclinata =

Species of gastropod

Iredalea inclinata is a species of sea snail, a marine gastropod mollusk in the family Drilliidae.

== Description ==
The size of an adult shell is moderately large and varies between 16 mm and 25 mm. The 9 teleoconch whorls contain 12–15 ribs.

== Distribution ==
This species occurs in the demersal zone of the Indo-Pacific off Southeast Africa, Mozambique, Madagascar, Mauritius and Réunion .
