= Ceritoturris thailandica =

Scientific classification
- Kingdom: Animalia
- Phylum: Mollusca
- Class: Gastropoda
- Subclass: Caenogastropoda
- Order: Neogastropoda
- Superfamily: Conoidea
- Family: Horaiclavidae
- Genus: Ceritoturris
- Species: C. thailandica

Binomial name
- Ceritoturris thailandica Robba et al., 2006

Species of gastropod

Ceritoturris thailandica is a species of sea snail, a marine gastropod mollusk in the family Horaiclavidae.

== Distribution ==
This marine species occurs in the Gulf of Thailand.
