= Sinployea kusaieana =

Conservation status
- Data Deficient (IUCN 2.3)

Scientific classification
- Kingdom: Animalia
- Phylum: Mollusca
- Class: Gastropoda
- Order: Stylommatophora
- Family: Charopidae
- Genus: Sinployea
- Species: S. kusaieana

Binomial name
- Sinployea kusaieana Solem, 1983

Species of gastropod

Sinployea kusaieana is a species of small air-breathing land snail, a terrestrial pulmonate gastropod mollusc in the family Charopidae. This species is endemic to Micronesia.
