= Iredalea agatho =

Scientific classification
- Kingdom: Animalia
- Phylum: Mollusca
- Class: Gastropoda
- Subclass: Caenogastropoda
- Order: Neogastropoda
- Superfamily: Conoidea
- Family: Drilliidae
- Genus: Iredalea
- Species: I. agatho

Binomial name
- Iredalea agatho (Dall, W.H., 1918)

Synonyms
- Pleurotoma (Mangilia) flexuosa Smith, E.A., 1882; Pleurotoma agatho Dall, 1918

Species of gastropod

Iredalea agatho is a species of sea snail, a marine gastropod mollusk in the family Drilliidae.

== Description ==
(original description of Pleurotoma (Mangilia) flexuosa in Latin) The shell is ovate and brownish white in color, ornamented with a reddish-brown line around the middle of the whorls and with two similar lines encircling the body whorl. It comprises six and a half whorls: the first one and a half are rounded and smooth, while the remaining whorls are strongly convex and furnished with fifteen to sixteen close-set, flexuous ribs, which fade on the body whorl before reaching the base. The body whorl is sculptured below with a few spiral striae. The aperture is ovate and equals half the total length of the shell. The outer lip, situated beyond the last and strongest rib, is greatly thickened, white within, and slightly and very shallowly sinuate above, just below the suture. The columella is provided with a thin callus connected to the suture, and the siphonal canal is very short and broad.
