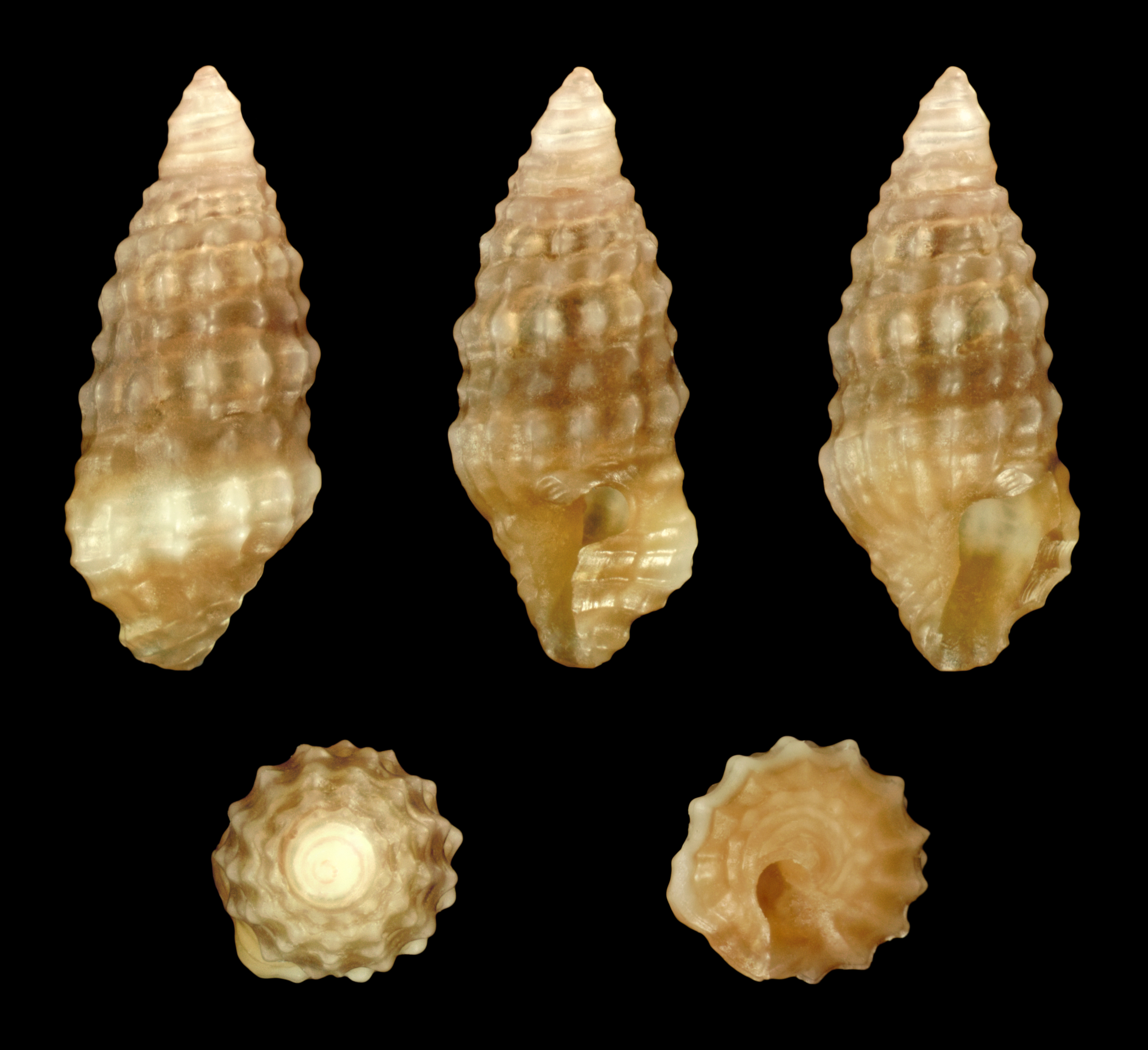
- Carinapex minutissima (Garrett, 1873)

Scientific classification
- Kingdom: Animalia
- Phylum: Mollusca
- Class: Gastropoda
- Subclass: Caenogastropoda
- Order: Neogastropoda
- Superfamily: Conoidea
- Family: Horaiclavidae
- Genus: Carinapex; Dall, 1924

Type species
- Drillia minutissima Garrett, 1873

Species
- See text

= Carinapex =

Genus of gastropods

Carinapex is a genus of sea snails, marine gastropod mollusks in the family Horaiclavidae.

It was previously included within the subfamily Crassispirinae, family Turridae.

== Species ==
Species within the genus Carinapex include:

- Carinapex albarnesi Wiedrick, 2015
- Carinapex alisonkayae Wiedrick, 2015
- Carinapex amirowlandae Wiedrick, 2015
- Carinapex cernohorskyi Wiedrick, 2015
- Carinapex chaneyi Wiedrick, 2015
- Carinapex johnwiedricki Wiedrick, 2015
- Carinapex lindseygrovesi Wiedrick, 2015
- Carinapex minutissima (Garrett, 1873)
- Carinapex mooreorum Wiedrick, 2015
- Carinapex papillosa (Garrett, 1873)
- Carinapex philippinensis Wiedrick, 2015
- Carinapex solomonensis Wiedrick, 2015
