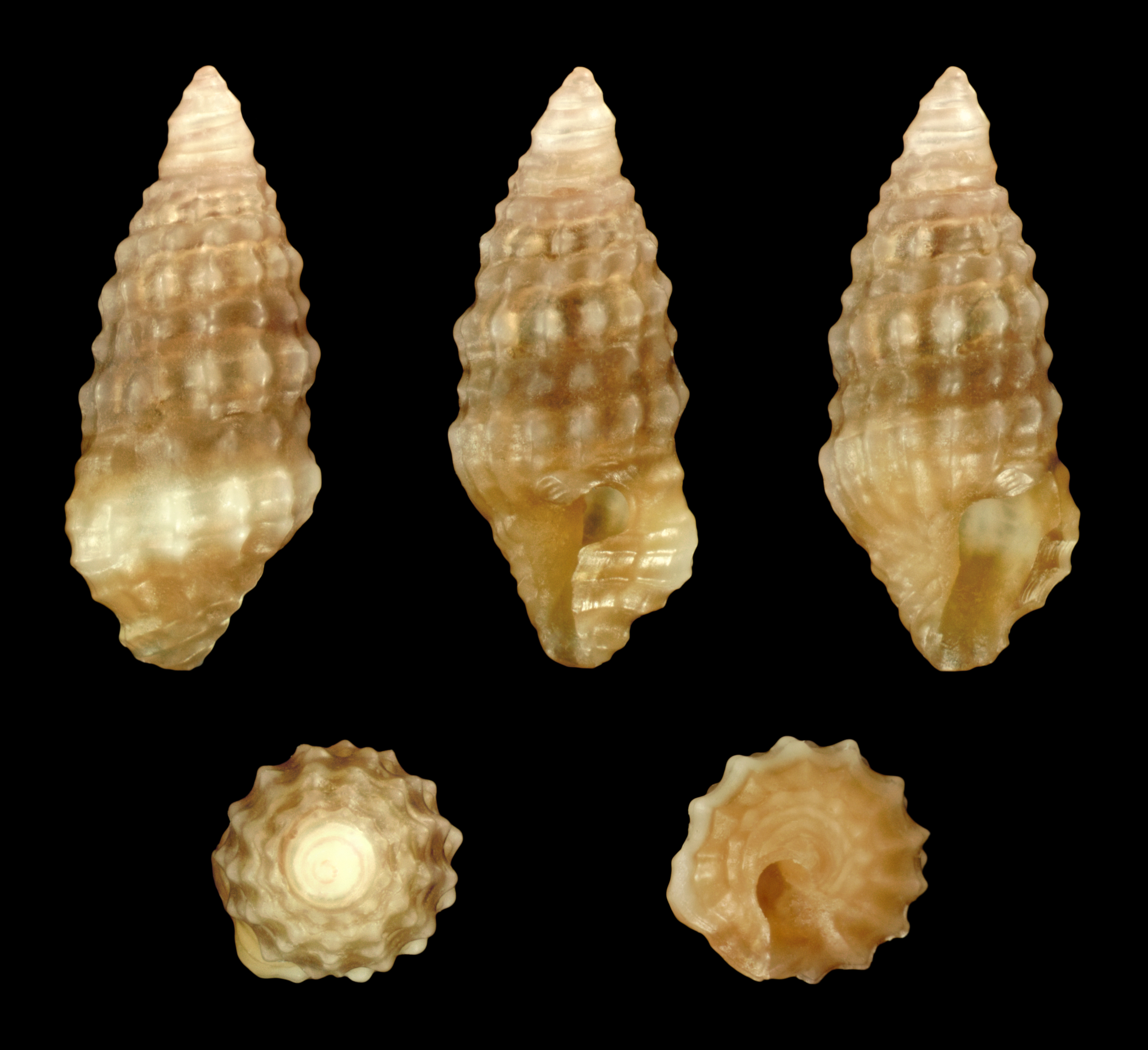

Scientific classification
- Kingdom: Animalia
- Phylum: Mollusca
- Class: Gastropoda
- Subclass: Caenogastropoda
- Order: Neogastropoda
- Superfamily: Conoidea
- Family: Horaiclavidae
- Genus: Carinapex
- Species: C. minutissima

Binomial name
- Carinapex minutissima (Garrett, 1873)

Synonyms
- Drillia minutissima Garrett, 1873

= Carinapex minutissima =

Species of gastropod

Carinapex minutissima is a species of sea snail, a marine gastropod mollusk in the family Horaiclavidae.

It was previously included within the subfamily Crassispirinae in the family Turridae.

== Description ==
The length of the shell varies between 2 mm and 3 mm.

(Original description) The minute, solid shell has an elongate ovate shape. The light brown spire is rather short. It contains 6 whorls, spirally granulated. The granules are rather large, closely set, disposed in two rows on the whorls of the spire, the lower one the larger. The base is contracted and spirally ridged. The aperture is ovate, deep-brown, one-third the length of the shell. The posterior sinus is large, circular, margins nearly united. The peristome is rather sharp and strongly arched. The columella is smooth and nearly vertical.

== Distribution ==
This marine species occurs off Hawaii, the Philippines, Taiwan and Réunion
