= Brephodrillia =

Scientific classification
- Kingdom: Animalia
- Phylum: Mollusca
- Class: Gastropoda
- Subclass: Caenogastropoda
- Order: Neogastropoda
- Family: Drilliidae
- Genus: Brephodrillia; Pilsbry & Lowe, 1932

Genus of gastropods

Brephodrillia is a genus of sea snails, marine gastropod mollusks in the family Drilliidae.

== Taxonomy ==
H. Pilsbry and H. Lowe(1932) put in Brephodrillia the species of Iredalea with a dorsal varix. with Brephodrillia perfectus Pilsbry and Lowe, 1932 as type species. This genus is, however, considered a synonym of Iredalea Oliver, 1915 by Powell, 1966 In 1989 Vaught treated Brephodrillia as a subgenus of Iredalea.

In 2011 Bouchet et al. treated Brephodrillia again as a synonym of Iredalea.

== Species ==
Accepted species within the genus Brephodrillia include:

- Brephodrillia ella Pilsbry & Lowe, 1932
- Brephodrillia perfectus Pilsbry & Lowe, 1932
