= Carinapex cernohorskyi =

Scientific classification
- Kingdom: Animalia
- Phylum: Mollusca
- Class: Gastropoda
- Subclass: Caenogastropoda
- Order: Neogastropoda
- Superfamily: Conoidea
- Family: Horaiclavidae
- Genus: Carinapex
- Species: C. cernohorskyi

Binomial name
- Carinapex cernohorskyi Wiedrick, 2015

Species of gastropod

Carinapex cernohorskyi is a species of sea snail, a marine gastropod mollusk in the family Horaiclavidae.

== Description ==
The length of the shell attains 4.2 mm.

== Distribution ==
This marine species occurs off French Polynesia, Hawaii, and the Okinawa Islands.
