= Brephodrillia perfectus =

Scientific classification
- Kingdom: Animalia
- Phylum: Mollusca
- Class: Gastropoda
- Subclass: Caenogastropoda
- Order: Neogastropoda
- Family: Drilliidae
- Genus: Brephodrillia
- Species: B. perfectus

Binomial name
- Brephodrillia perfectus Pilsbry & Lowe, 1932

Synonyms
- Iredalea (Brephodrillia) perfecta (Pilsbry & Lowe, 1932)

Species of gastropod

Brephodrillia perfectus is a species of sea snail, a marine gastropod mollusk in the family Drilliidae.

== Description ==
The shell grows to a length of 6 mm.

== Distribution ==
This species occurs in the Pacific Ocean between Mexico and Panama.
