= Brephodrillia ella =

Scientific classification
- Kingdom: Animalia
- Phylum: Mollusca
- Class: Gastropoda
- Subclass: Caenogastropoda
- Order: Neogastropoda
- Family: Drilliidae
- Genus: Brephodrillia
- Species: B. ella

Binomial name
- Brephodrillia ella Pilsbry & Lowe, 1932

Synonyms
- Iredalea (Brephodrillia) ella (Pilsbry & Lowe, 1932)

Species of gastropod

Brephodrillia ella is a species of sea snail, a marine gastropod mollusk in the family Drilliidae.

== Distribution ==
This species occurs in the Pacific Ocean between Nicaragua and Panama.
