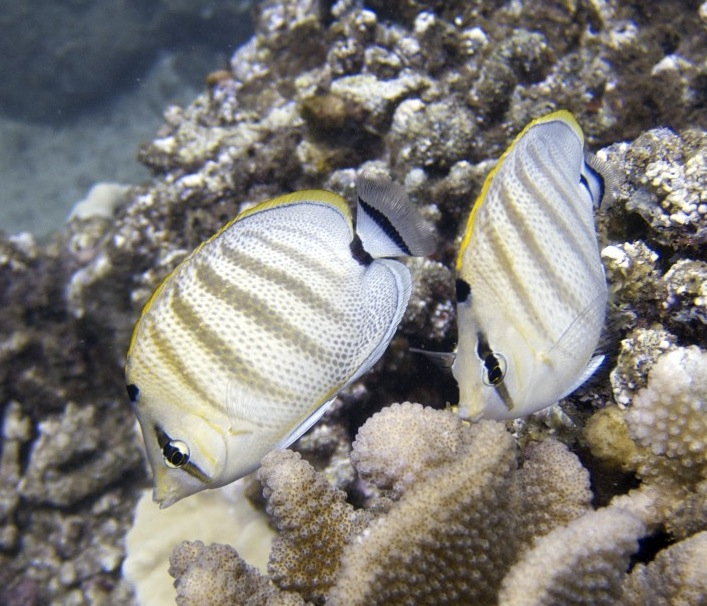
- Pebbled butterflyfish are often found in pairs

Conservation status
- Least Concern (IUCN 3.1)

Scientific classification
- Kingdom: Animalia
- Phylum: Chordata
- Class: Actinopterygii
- Order: Acanthuriformes
- Family: Chaetodontidae
- Genus: Chaetodon
- Subgenus: Chaetodon (Exornator)
- Species: C. multicinctus

Binomial name
- Chaetodon multicinctus A. Garrett, 1863

Synonyms
- Exornator exornator multicinctus (Garrett, 1863)

= Pebbled butterflyfish =

Species of fish

The pebbled butterflyfish (Chaetodon multicinctus) is a species of marine fish, a butterflyfish from the family Chaetodontidae. It is often found near reefs. They are at most 12 centimetres (4.7 in) in length, and white with yellow, brown, and black markings. These butterflyfish are territorial and form pairs. The pebbled butterflyfish occur near reefs in the eastern central Pacific, and are endemic to waters off the Hawaiian Islands and Johnston Atoll. They have a role in aquarium trade.

== Description and biology ==
Pebbled butterflyfish reach maximum lengths of 12 centimetres (4.7 in). The body is spotted and white, though it may bear shades of green and yellow. There are five light brown bands crossing the side of the body. On the ventral side, a dark line extends from the anal fins, gradually lightening to yellow as it moves towards the pelvic fins. Though often mistaken for the crochet butterflyfish (Chaetodon guentheri) or speckled butterflyfish (Chaetodon citrinellus), the pebbled butterflyfish can be distinguished by its vertical bands.

On the dorsal and anal fins, there is a black line running lengthwise, approximately one-third the total height of the fin from the outer margin. The pelvic fins are white, and the pectorals are transparent. The caudal fin bears a black crescent at its middle and a dark ring at its base.

They form pairs, especially for breeding, and lay eggs. Pebbled butterflyfish are monogamous and are aggressively territorial. They will mate to defend a feeding territory. The diet of the pebbled butterflyfish is fairly specialist, and is composed of coral polyps, polychaete worms, and small shrimps.

== Distribution and habitat ==
Pebbled butterflyfish are distributed throughout the eastern central Pacific Ocean. They are found in waters off the Hawaiian Islands and Johnston Atoll. Pebbled butterflyfish occur near coral reefs and over rocks.
