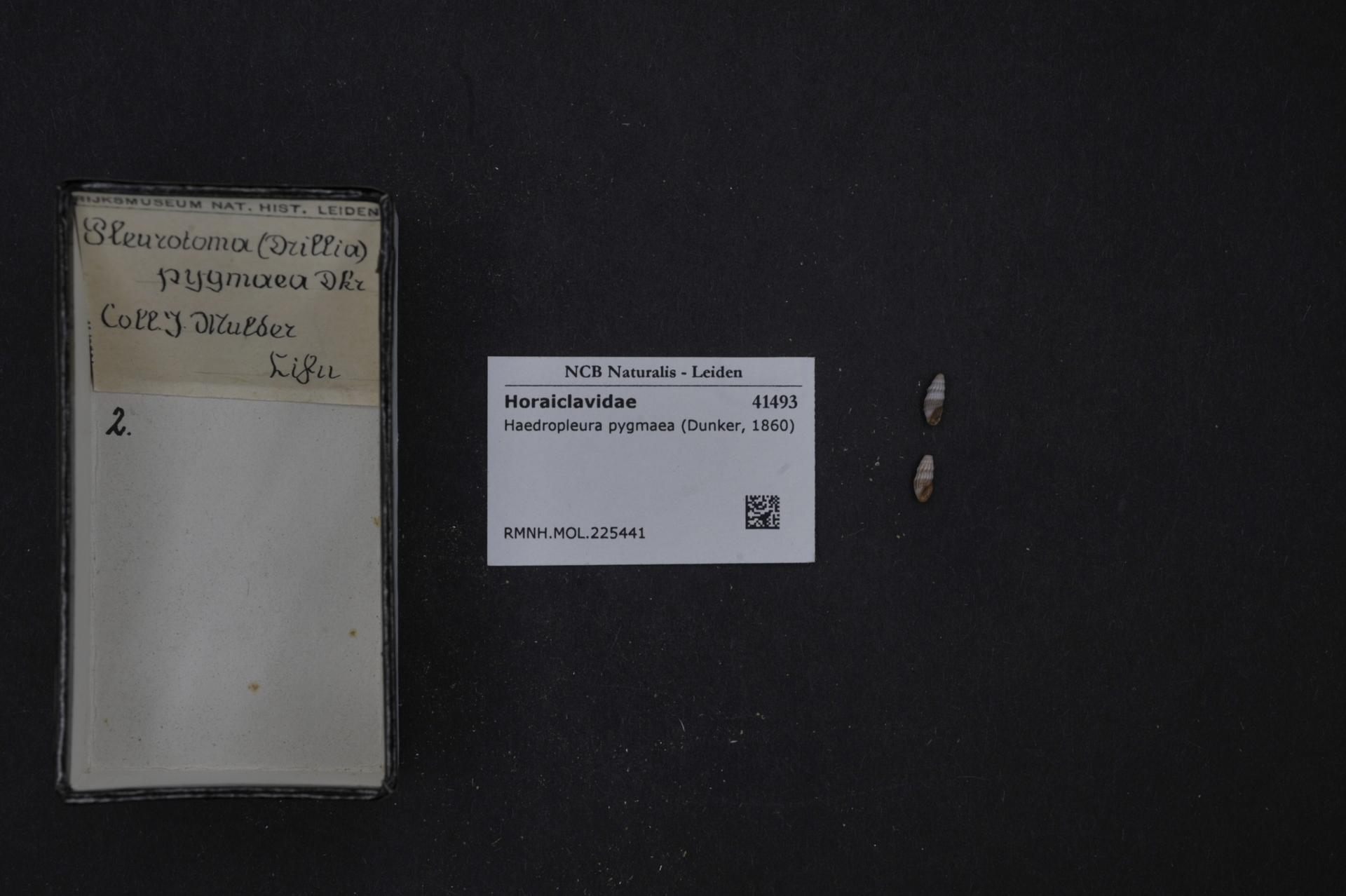

Scientific classification
- Kingdom: Animalia
- Phylum: Mollusca
- Class: Gastropoda
- Subclass: Caenogastropoda
- Order: Neogastropoda
- Superfamily: Conoidea
- Family: Drilliidae
- Genus: Iredalea
- Species: I. pygmaea

Binomial name
- Iredalea pygmaea (Dunker, 1860)

Synonyms
- Haedropleura fukuchiana Yokoyama, 1922; Haedropleura pygmaea (Dunker, 1860) ·; Mangilia pygmaea Dunker, 1860; Mangilia victor G.B. Sowerby III, 1894 (taxon inquirendum)

= Iredalea pygmaea =

Species of gastropod

Iredalea pygmaea is a species of sea snail, a marine gastropod mollusk in the family Drilliidae.

== Description ==
The length of the shell attains 5 mm.

The light-brown shell is longitudinally plicate. The plicae are evanescent towards the base of the body whorl.

== Distribution ==
This marine species occurs off Mauritius, Taiwan, Japan and Fiji.
