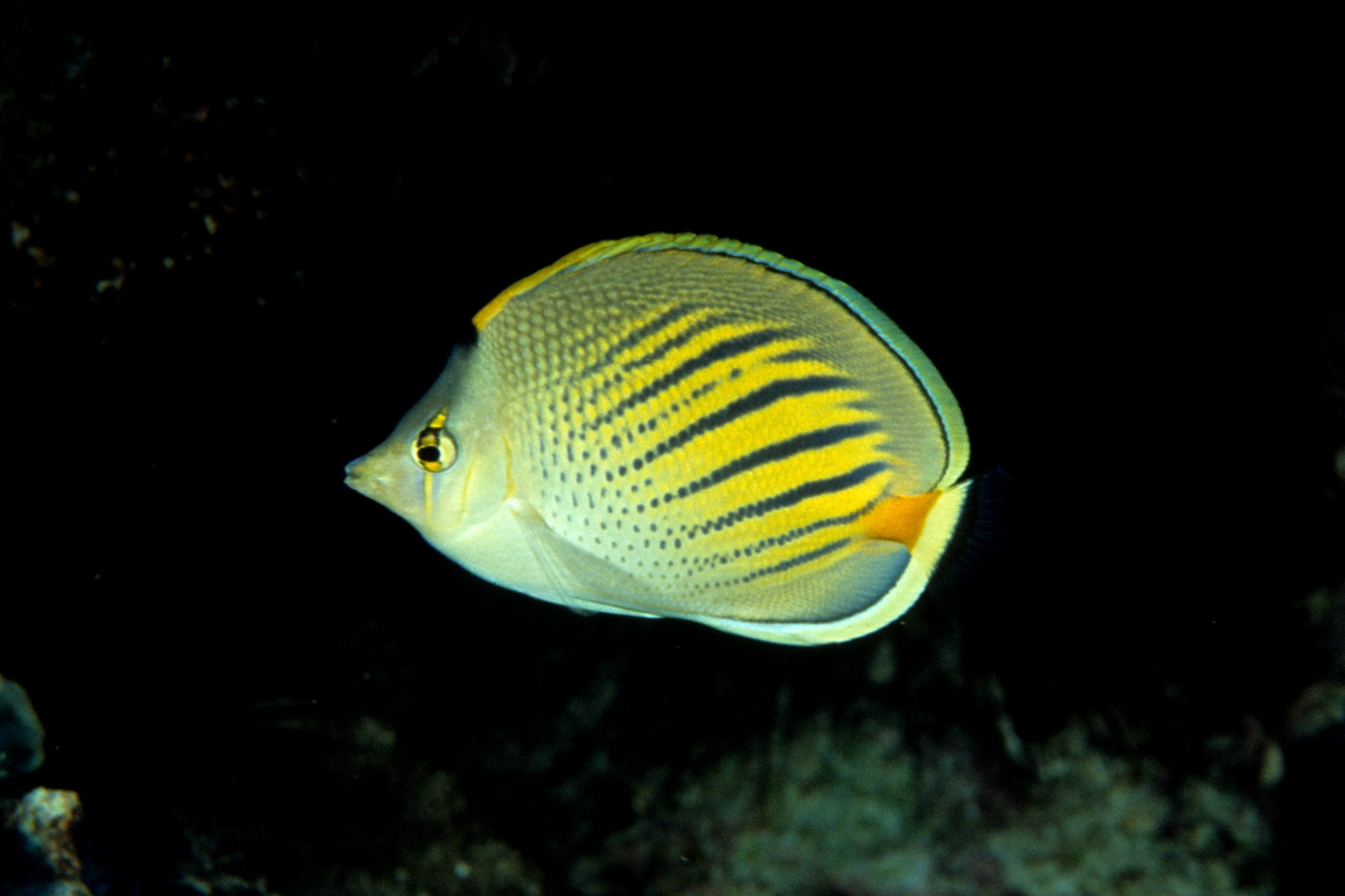

Conservation status
- Least Concern (IUCN 3.1)

Scientific classification
- Kingdom: Animalia
- Phylum: Chordata
- Class: Actinopterygii
- Division: Teleostei
- Order: Acanthuriformes
- Family: Chaetodontidae
- Genus: Chaetodon
- Subgenus: Chaetodon (Exornator)
- Species: C. pelewensis

Binomial name
- Chaetodon pelewensis Kner, 1868

Synonyms
- Chaetodon germanus De Vis, 1884

= Chaetodon pelewensis =

Species of fish

Chaetodon pelewensis, the dot dash butterflyfish, spotbanded butterflyfish or punctato butterflyfish, is a species of marine ray-finned fish, a butterflyfish belonging to the family Chaetodontidae. It is found in the western Pacific Ocean.

== Description ==
Chaetodon pelwensis has a dusky yellow body with diagonal stripes across the body and black-margined gold vertical bar through the eye. There is a black spot on the head. The stripes break up into spots towards the head and on the lower flanks. The margins of the fins are bright yellow and the base of the caudal fin is bright orange. The dorsal fin has 13–14 spines and 22–25 soft rays while the anal fin has 3 spines and 17–18 soft rays. It attains a maximum total length of 12.5 centimetres (4.9 in).

== Distribution ==
Chaetodon pelewensis is found across the southern Pacific Ocean from Papua New Guinea to the Tuamotu Archipelago. This species is abundant on the Great Barrier Reef and in the Coral Sea. In Australia it extends as far south as central New South Wales and Lord Howe Island.

== Habitat and biology ==
Chaetodon pelewensis is found in coral reefs at depths of at least 45 metres (148 ft). They feed largely on coral polyps and some benthic invertebrates. This species is oviparous and monogamous, breeding in pairs. Occasionally it will form mixed pairs with the spotband butterflyfish (C. punctatofasciatus), and these species are known to hybridise.

== Taxonomy and etymology ==
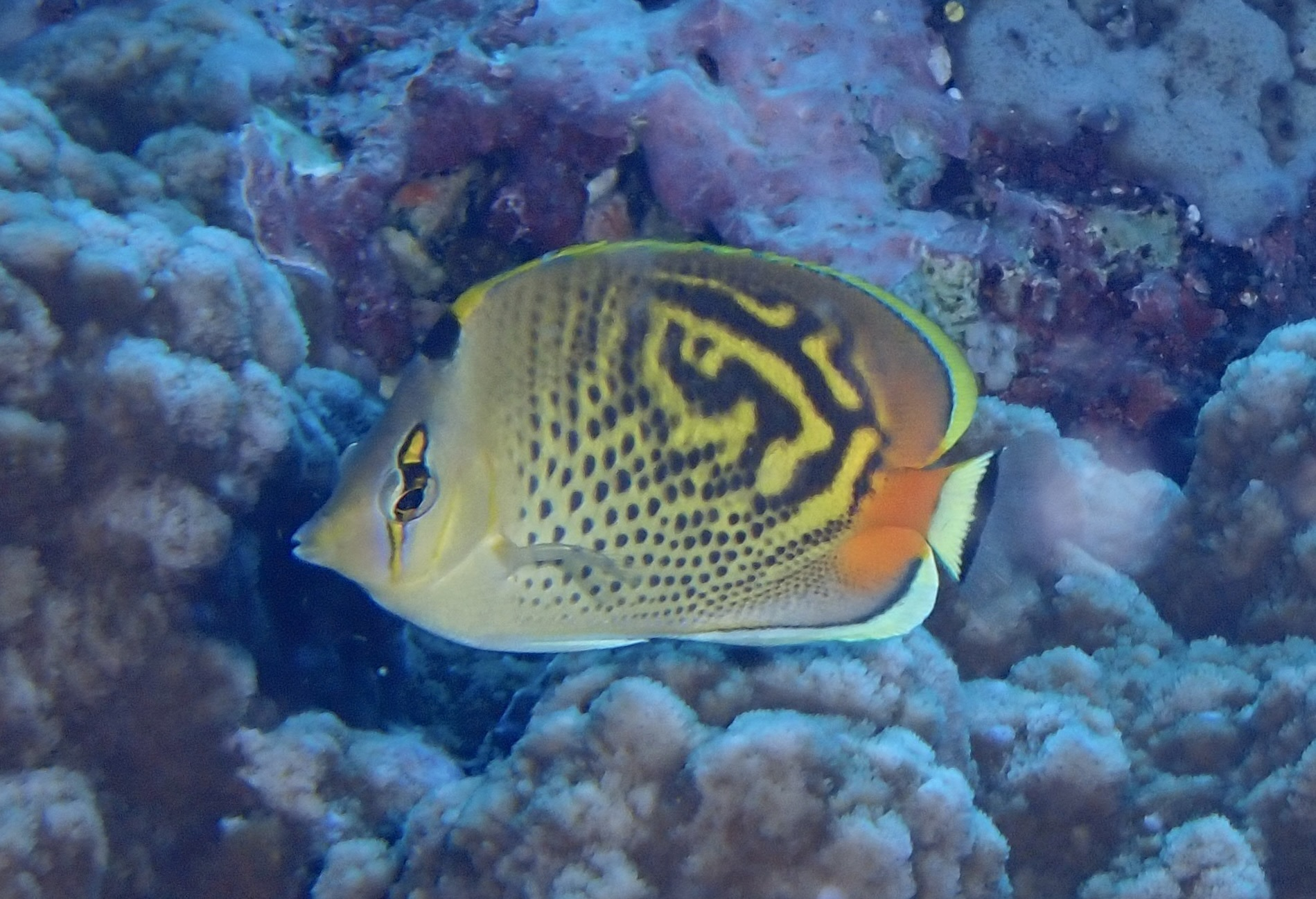
C. pelewensis × C. punctatofasciatus hybrid

Chaetodon pelewensis was first formally described in 1868 by the Austrian ichthyologist Rudolf Kner (1810–1869) with the type locality given as Palau in the Western Pacific, Pelew Inseln in German, in error when the correct type locality is probably the Society Islands. The specific name reflects the erroneous designation of the type locality. This species is placed in the subgenus Exornator, if the genus Chaetodon is split up, Exornator might become a subgenus of Lepidochaetodon.

== Utilisation ==
Chaetodon pelewensis is commonly found in the aquarium trade and in the period 1988 to 2002 over 12,000 individuals of this species were traded.
