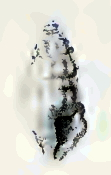
- Original image of a shell of Iredalea theoteles

Scientific classification
- Kingdom: Animalia
- Phylum: Mollusca
- Class: Gastropoda
- Subclass: Caenogastropoda
- Order: Neogastropoda
- Superfamily: Conoidea
- Family: Drilliidae
- Genus: Iredalea
- Species: I. theoteles

Binomial name
- Iredalea theoteles (Melvill, J.C. & R. Standen, 1897, "1896")

Synonyms
- Ceritoturris theoteles (Melvill & Standen, 1896); Mangilia (Glyphostoma) theoteles Melvill, J.C. & R. Standen, 1897, "1896" (original combination)

= Iredalea theoteles =

Species of gastropod

Iredalea theoteles is a species of sea snail, a marine gastropod mollusk in the family Drilliidae.

== Description ==
The length of the shell is about 3.5 mm, and its diameter is about 1.75 mm.

This very small shell has some slight resemblance to Mangilia thepalea Melvill & Standen, 1896 (a taxon inquirendum). The nodulous papillae are, however, much larger in proportion to the size of the shell, and, in consequence, fewer. The upper whorls are closely tubercled, shining white. The four rows—two on the penultimate, two on the last whorl—are approximate, and the space contained by them is banded with ochre, the white shining nodules standing out more prominently. The aperture is narrow and oblong. The anal sinus is deep. The outer lip is much thickened, four toothed within as is the columellar margin.

== Distribution ==
This marine species occurs off the Loyalty Islands and is rare.
