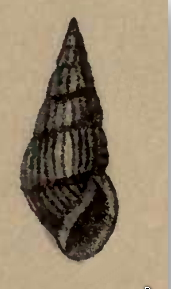
- Image of a shell of Iredalea exilis

Scientific classification
- Kingdom: Animalia
- Phylum: Mollusca
- Class: Gastropoda
- Subclass: Caenogastropoda
- Order: Neogastropoda
- Superfamily: Conoidea
- Family: Drilliidae
- Genus: Iredalea
- Species: I. exilis

Binomial name
- Iredalea exilis (Pease, 1860)

Synonyms
- Clavus exilis (Pease, 1868) ·; Drillia exilis Pease, 1867; Pseudodaphnella exilis Pease 1860

= Iredalea exilis =

Species of gastropod

Iredalea exilis is a species of sea snail, a marine gastropod mollusk in the family Drilliidae.

== Description ==
The length of the shell attains 5.5 mm.

The whorls are nearly plane and longitudinally plicately ribbed. The ribs are small and close, descending from the sutures. The aperture is very short. The siphonal canal is short and open. The shell is reddish chestnut, the ribs whitish, with a dark band below the middle of the body whorl.

== Distribution ==
This marine species occurs in the Indo-west Pacific Ocean off Tahiti.
