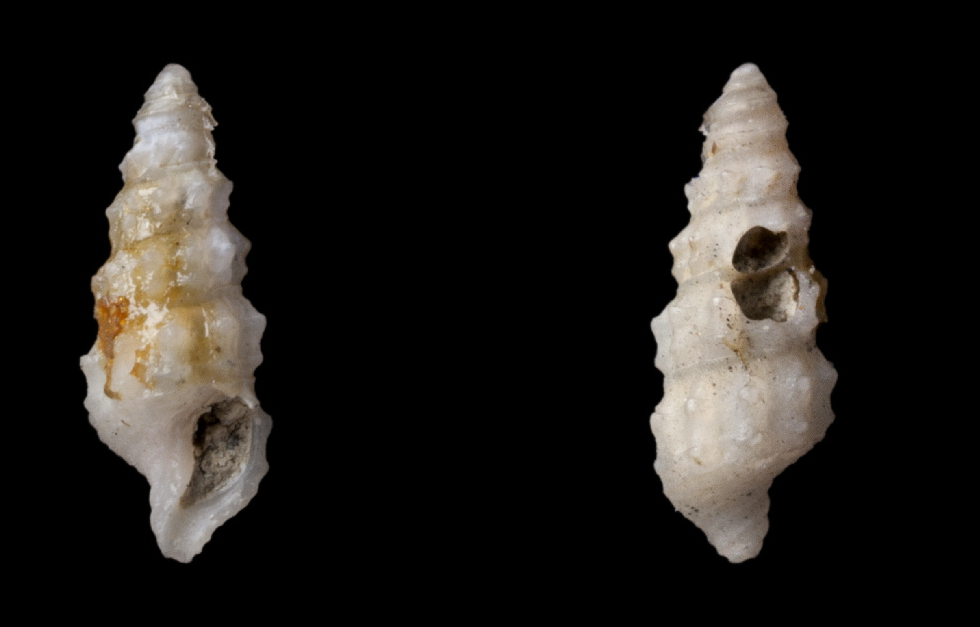
- Shell of Ceritoturris pupiformis (specimen at Natural History Museum, London)

Scientific classification
- Kingdom: Animalia
- Phylum: Mollusca
- Class: Gastropoda
- Subclass: Caenogastropoda
- Order: Neogastropoda
- Superfamily: Conoidea
- Family: Horaiclavidae
- Genus: Ceritoturris
- Species: C. pupiformis

Binomial name
- Ceritoturris pupiformis (E. A. Smith, 1884)

Synonyms
- Mangelia pupiformis (E. A. Smith, 1884); Mangilia callistephana Melvill, 1904; Pleurotoma (Drillia) pupiformis E. A. Smith, 1884 (original combination)

= Ceritoturris pupiformis =

Species of gastropod

Ceritoturris pupiformis is a species of sea snail, a marine gastropod mollusk in the family Horaiclavidae.

== Description ==
The length of shell attains 4.3 mm, its diameter 1.3 mm.

The shell is oblong, narrow and almost pupiform. Its color is white and slightly red at the apex. It contains 8 whorls of which two in the protoconch. The whorls increase but slowly and the last three are of nearly the same width. They are divided at the suture by a fine keel, and a double series of largish and rather acute tubercles surround the middle. The small aperture measures about a third of the total length of the shell. The outer lip is thin. The siphonal canal is very short and narrow.

== Distribution ==
This marine species occurs in the Gulf of Oman and in the Persian Gulf .
