= Andrew Garrett (explorer) =

American naturalist (1823–1887)

Andrew Garrett (1823–1887), was an American explorer, naturalist and illustrator. He specialized in malacology and ichthyology.

== Life ==
Garrett was born in Albany, New York; his family moved to Middlebury, Vermont, when he was a child. Considering himself a "Vermontian" throughout his life, he went to sea at age 16 (after an apprenticeship in a local iron foundry) mainly to get away and collect sea shells.

Making Hawaii his home from 1857 to 1863, Garrett was initially supported and sponsored by local shell collectors, including the malacologist William Harper Pease. They admired his zeal and sense of adventure as together they found new species and developed a keen sense for scientific details. Soon they were publishing papers on the topic of conchology, for both for local and international scientists - mostly under Pease's name.

Running out of funds, Garrett approached the ichthyologist Louis Agassiz, who had moved from his native Switzerland to head the new department of Comparative Zoology at Harvard University. Within the year he was part of a team that hunted for unusual species all over Polynesia, to sketch and paint them as lifelike as possible and send fishes conserved in alcohol for the growing collection at Harvard.

Completely self-taught, Garrett became a renowned and admired specialist in the field himself: a skilled artist and adventurer-scientist, he eventually found a new sponsor in Johann Cesar (VI) Godeffroy, a wealthy scion of international commerce based in Hamburg, Germany. This support helped him explore and describe the shells and fishes of Eastern Polynesia: Samoa, Fiji and other locations. Settling on the island of Huahine in 1870, he made it his home and headquarters as he kept collecting shells, fish and eventually also native tools and artifacts, of anthropological importance, to the Museum Godeffroy in Germany until 1879, when Godeffroy went bankrupt.

Garrett's seminal work Fische der Sundsee was first published in 1872 and remained of primary importance for the next generation of ichthyologists. He never returned to the United States, and died on November 1, 1887, on the island of Huahine where he had put down roots. Rumor has it that he wrote his own obituary, and had the local missionary Ebenezer Cooper (from the London Missionary Society) send it out into the world he had left behind in his wanderings.

== Bibliography ==
- (1872) "Descriptions of new species of land and fresh-water shells". American Journal of Conchology 7(4): 219-30.
- (1873-1910). Fische der Sundsee L. Friederichsen & Co., Hamburg. Fische der Südsee: 1-515, Pls. 1-180.

This work was first published in parts by the Museum Godeffroy (Fische der Südsee, beschrieben und redigirt von Albert C. L. G. Günther A. C. L. G. Günther. Hefts I-IX in Bands I-III. As: J. Mus. Godeffroy Hefts III, VI, IX, XI, XIII, XV, XVI and XVII in Bands II, IV, VI.)

- (1884) "The terrestrial Mollusca inhabiting the Society Islands". Journal of the Academy of Natural Sciences of Philadelphia. 2nd series. 9: 17-114, pls. 2, 3.
- 1887. The terrestrial Mollusca inhabiting the Samoa or Navigator Islands. Proceedings of the Academy of Natural Sciences of Philadelphia 1887: 124-53.

Collection of 20 watercolors of slugs by Andrew Garrett from 1863 to 1879 is in Academy of Natural Sciences.
