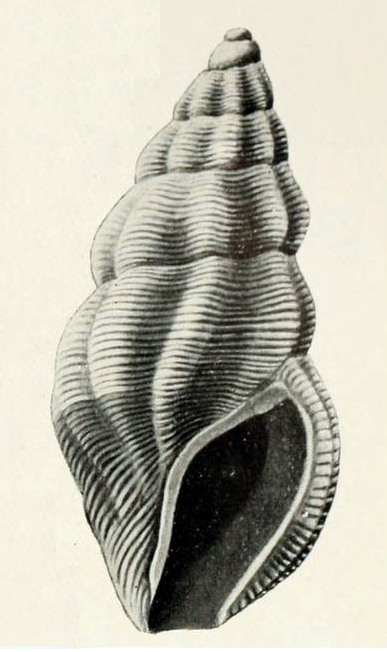
- Original image of a shell of Anacithara conata

Scientific classification
- Kingdom: Animalia
- Phylum: Mollusca
- Class: Gastropoda
- Subclass: Caenogastropoda
- Order: Neogastropoda
- Superfamily: Conoidea
- Family: Horaiclavidae
- Genus: Anacithara
- Species: A. conata

Binomial name
- Anacithara conata (Hedley, 1909)

Synonyms
- Mangelia conata Hedley, 1909 (superseded combination); Mangelia naufraga conata Hedley, 1909

= Anacithara conata =

Species of gastropod

Anacithara conata is a species of sea snail, a marine gastropod mollusc in the family Horaiclavidae.

== Description ==
(Original description) The shell is shorter and broader than Anacithara naufraga (Hedley, 1909). Its color is pale brown with a chocolate peripheral band.

== Distribution ==
This marine species is endemic to Australia and occurs off Queensland.
