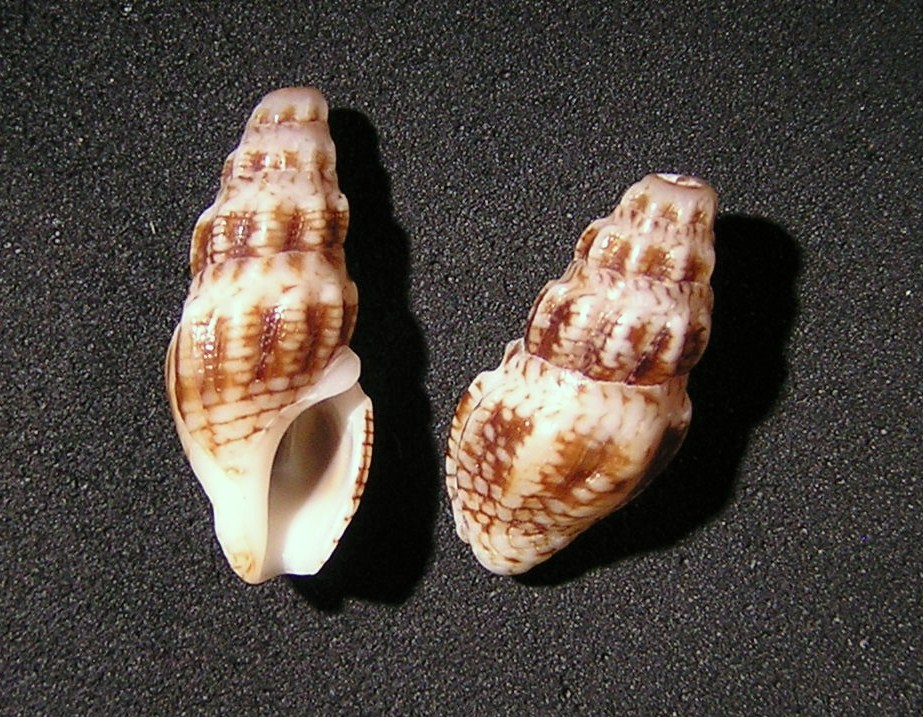
- Two views of a shell of Nquma rousi

Scientific classification
- Kingdom: Animalia
- Phylum: Mollusca
- Class: Gastropoda
- Subclass: Caenogastropoda
- Order: Neogastropoda
- Superfamily: Conoidea
- Family: Horaiclavidae
- Genus: Nquma
- Species: N. rousi

Binomial name
- Nquma rousi (Sowerby III, 1886)

Synonyms
- Clionella elizabethae Bartsch, P., 1915; Drillia albotessellata E.A. Smith, 1906; Drillia rousi (G.B. Sowerby III, 1886); Pleurotoma rousi Sowerby III, 1886

= Nquma rousi =

Species of gastropod

Nquma rousi is a species of sea snail, a marine gastropod mollusk in the family Horaiclavidae.

== Description ==
The length of the shell attains 17 mm.

The shell is broadly fusiform. The posterior two-fifths of the whorls between the sutures shows a strongly excavated channel. The anterior three-fifths are marked by 10–12 prominent, broad, low, rounded, somewhat protractive axial ribs which are truncated posteriorly by the channel, their terminations forming cusps. The intercostal spaces are about twice as wide as the ribs. The ribbed portions of the whorls on the spire are covered by five, equal and equally spaced, incised, spiral lines. The summit of the whorls are appressed, rendering the sutures ill-defined. The base of the body whorl is moderately long, marked by the feeble continuations of the axial ribs and on the posterior half by five incised spiral lines equaling those on the spire in strength and spacing and forming a continuous series with them. The anterior portion of the base shows about seven ill-defined spiral lirations. The aperture is narrowly elongate pyriform. The sinus is shallow immediately below the sutures. The outer lip is somewhat sinuous. The columella is strong, slightly sigmoid. The coloration of the type consists of a creamy white ground, which is almost unmarked in the subsutural channel and on the anterior half of the base on the last turn. A few dots of brownish orange appear near the summit between the ribs of the preceding whorls. The ribbed portion of the whorl between the anterior and posterior portion of the base is strongly mottled with brownish orange in the intercostal spaces, less so on the summits of the ribs, while a little posterior to the middle the base is marked by two slender spiral lines of the same color.

== Distribution ==
This marine species occurs off Cape Agulhas to Southern KwaZulu-Natal, South Africa; also off Southern Madagascar.
