= Anacithara clifdenica =

Scientific classification
- Kingdom: Animalia
- Phylum: Mollusca
- Class: Gastropoda
- Subclass: Caenogastropoda
- Order: Neogastropoda
- Superfamily: Conoidea
- Family: Horaiclavidae
- Genus: Anacithara
- Species: †A. clifdenica

Binomial name
- †Anacithara clifdenica A.W.B. Powell, 1942

Extinct species of gastropod

Anacithara clifdenica is an extinct species of sea snail, a marine gastropod mollusk in the family Horaiclavidae.

== Distribution ==
This extinct marine species occurred off New Zealand in Lower and Middle Miocene strata.
