= Anacithara biconica =

Scientific classification
- Kingdom: Animalia
- Phylum: Mollusca
- Class: Gastropoda
- Subclass: Caenogastropoda
- Order: Neogastropoda
- Superfamily: Conoidea
- Family: Horaiclavidae
- Genus: Anacithara
- Species: A. biconica

Binomial name
- Anacithara biconica Barros, Santana & Lima, 2015

Species of gastropod

Anacithara biconica is a species of sea snails, a marine gastropod mollusc in the family Horaiclavidae.

== Distribution ==
This marine species occurs in the Atlantic Ocean off Rio Grande do Norte, Brazil.
