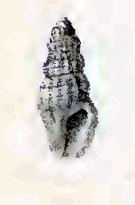
- Original image of a shell of Anacithara themeropis

Scientific classification
- Kingdom: Animalia
- Phylum: Mollusca
- Class: Gastropoda
- Subclass: Caenogastropoda
- Order: Neogastropoda
- Superfamily: Conoidea
- Family: Horaiclavidae
- Genus: Anacithara
- Species: A. themeropis

Binomial name
- Anacithara themeropis (Melvill & Standen, 1896)

Synonyms
- Drillia themeropis Melvill & Standen, 1896 (original combination); Drillia xanthoporphyria Melvill & Standen, 1896; Iredalea xanthoporphyria Melvill, J.C. & R. Standen, 1897, "1896"

= Anacithara themeropis =

Species of gastropod

Anacithara themeropis is a species of sea snail, a marine gastropod mollusk in the family Horaiclavidae.

== Description ==
(Original description) The length of the ventricose shell attains 5 mm, its diameter 2 mm. Two forms have been seen by us, differing in colour as follows :—In what would be considered the type, an ashy brown is the prevailing hue, filleted round the whorls transversely with bluish white. In the other, a handsomer variety, a warm ochre with flecking and median brown linear banding round the three last whorls, which are seven in number altogether. The form of the shell is oblong. It is very solid, obtusely ribbed with fine spiral striae. The outer lip is extremely thickened. The inner lip is simple. The aperture is ovate. The columella is simple.

== Distribution ==
This marine species occurs off the Loyalty Islands.
