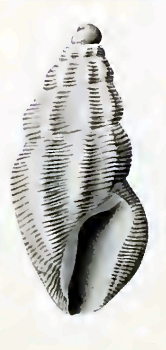
- Original image of a shell of Anacithara propinqua

Scientific classification
- Kingdom: Animalia
- Phylum: Mollusca
- Class: Gastropoda
- Subclass: Caenogastropoda
- Order: Neogastropoda
- Superfamily: Conoidea
- Family: Horaiclavidae
- Genus: Anacithara
- Species: A. propinqua

Binomial name
- Anacithara propinqua Hedley, 1922

= Anacithara propinqua =

Species of gastropod

Anacithara propinqua is a species of sea snail, a marine gastropod mollusk in the family Horaiclavidae.

== Description ==
The length of the shell attains 4.2 mm, its diameter 2 mm.

(Original description) The small, rather solid shell has an ovate-fusiform shape. Its colour is uniform pale buff or uniform pale lilac. It contains six whorls. The protoconch is slightly tilted. The ribs are rather prominent, rounded, set their own breadth apart, discontinuous from whorl to whorl, those on the body whorl gradually vanishing below the periphery. The ribs number nine on the penultimate whorl. There are fine, close, even spiral threads that overrun the whole shell. The wide aperture is unarmed. The varix is massive. The sinus is rather shallow. The siphonal canal is short and wide.

== Distribution ==
This marine species is endemic to Australia and occurs off Queensland.
