= Anacithara subrissoina =

Scientific classification
- Kingdom: Animalia
- Phylum: Mollusca
- Class: Gastropoda
- Subclass: Caenogastropoda
- Order: Neogastropoda
- Superfamily: Conoidea
- Family: Horaiclavidae
- Genus: Anacithara
- Species: A. subrissoina

Binomial name
- Anacithara subrissoina Kilburn, 1994

Species of mollusc

Anacithara subrissoina is a species of sea snail, a marine gastropod mollusk in the family Horaiclavidae.

== Description ==
The length of this white shell varies between 5.6 mm and 8.4 mm.

== Distribution ==
This marine species is endemic to South Africa and occurs off the continental shelf of Zululand and Natal.
