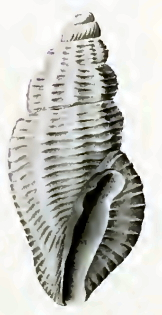
- Original image of a shell of Anacithara leptalea

Scientific classification
- Kingdom: Animalia
- Phylum: Mollusca
- Class: Gastropoda
- Subclass: Caenogastropoda
- Order: Neogastropoda
- Superfamily: Conoidea
- Family: Horaiclavidae
- Genus: Anacithara
- Species: A. leptalea

Binomial name
- Anacithara leptalea Hedley, 1922

= Anacithara leptalea =

Species of gastropod

Anacithara leptalea is a species of sea snail, a marine gastropod mollusk in the family Horaiclavidae.

== Description ==
The length of the shell attains 3.5 mm, its diameter 1.5 mm.

(Original description) The small, solid shell is narrowly ovate. Its colour is uniform white. It contains six whorls, including a smooth two-whorled protoconch. Prominent ribs, parted by their own breadth, are set at nine or ten to a whorl.;Both ribs and interstices are traversed by a series of uniform sharp spiral threads—six on the penultimate whorl and thirteen on the body whorl. The aperture is narrow, protected by a broad and high varix. The siphonal canal is short and open. The sinus is a semicircular notch. There are no denticules on the lips, but a deeply seated fold is just visible on the columella.

== Distribution ==
This marine species is endemic to Australia and occurs off Queensland.
