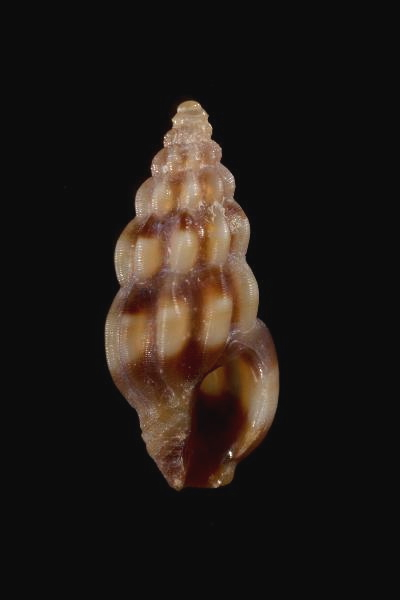
- Shell of Graciliclava costata (specimen at MNHN, Paris)

Scientific classification
- Kingdom: Animalia
- Phylum: Mollusca
- Class: Gastropoda
- Subclass: Caenogastropoda
- Order: Neogastropoda
- Superfamily: Conoidea
- Family: Horaiclavidae
- Genus: Graciliclava; Shuto, 1983

Type species
- Graciliclava mackayensis Shuto, 1983

Species
- See text

= Graciliclava =

Genus of gastropods

Graciliclava is a genus of sea snails, marine gastropod mollusks in the family Horaiclavidae.

It was previously included within the subfamily Crassispirinae, family Turridae. Killburn in 1994 was of the opinion that Graciliclava was closely related to and possibly a subgenus of Anacithara

== Species ==
Species within the genus Graciliclava include:

- Graciliclava costata (Hedley, 1922)

Species brought into synonymy

- Graciliclava mackayensis Shuto, 1983: synonym of Graciliclava costata (Hedley, 1922)
