= Pseudexomilus bicarinatus =

Scientific classification
- Kingdom: Animalia
- Phylum: Mollusca
- Class: Gastropoda
- Subclass: Caenogastropoda
- Order: Neogastropoda
- Superfamily: Conoidea
- Family: Horaiclavidae
- Genus: Pseudexomilus
- Species: P. bicarinatus

Binomial name
- Pseudexomilus bicarinatus Shuto, 1983

Species of gastropod

Pseudexomilus bicarinatus is a species of sea snail, a marine gastropod mollusk in the family Horaiclavidae.

== Taxonomy ==
The species was first described by Tsugio Shuto in 1983.

== Distribution ==
This marine species is endemic to Australia and occurs off Queensland.
