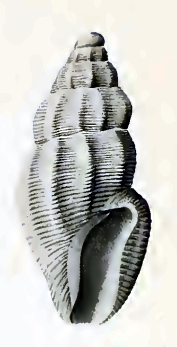
- Original image of a shell of Anacithara brevicostata

Scientific classification
- Kingdom: Animalia
- Phylum: Mollusca
- Class: Gastropoda
- Subclass: Caenogastropoda
- Order: Neogastropoda
- Superfamily: Conoidea
- Family: Horaiclavidae
- Genus: Anacithara
- Species: A. brevicostata

Binomial name
- Anacithara brevicostata Hedley, 1922

= Anacithara brevicostata =

Species of gastropod

Anacithara brevicostata is a species of sea snail, a marine gastropod mollusk in the family Horaiclavidae.

== Description ==
The length of the shell measures up to 4.5 mm, and its diameter to 2 mm.

(Original description) The small, thin shell has an elongate-ovate shape. Its colour is pale buff, with a narrow subsutural baud. It contains six rounded whorls, including the two whorls in the protoconch, which is smooth, turbinate, and slightly tilted. The ribs are rather prominent, rounded and broader than their interstices. They number nine on the penultimate whorl and on the body whorl ten.;These are spaced more widely than those above, commencing at the suture and terminating rather abruptly at the periphery. The spirals are even, comparatively coarse, and close-set threads, which overrun the whole shell. The wide aperture is unarmed. The varix is slight. The sinus is indistinct. The siphonal canal is a mere notch.

== Distribution ==
This marine species is endemic to Australia and occurs off Queensland.
