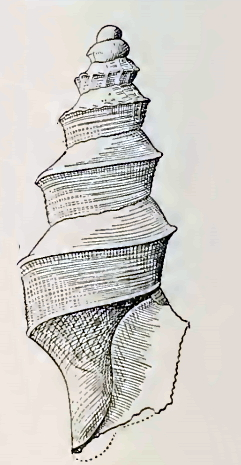
- Original image of a shell of Austrocarina recta

Scientific classification
- Kingdom: Animalia
- Phylum: Mollusca
- Class: Gastropoda
- Subclass: Caenogastropoda
- Order: Neogastropoda
- Superfamily: Conoidea
- Family: Horaiclavidae
- Genus: Austrocarina
- Species: A. recta

Binomial name
- Austrocarina recta (Hedley, 1903)

Synonyms
- Filodrillia recta (Hedley, 1903); Leucosyrinx recta Hedley, 1903

= Austrocarina recta =

Species of gastropod

Austrocarina recta is a species of small sea snail, a marine gastropod mollusk in the family Horaiclavidae.

It was formerly included within the family Pseudomelatomidae.

== Description ==
The length of the shell attains 6 mm, its diameter 2.5 mm.

(Original description) The thin, tall and narrow shell has a pagodiform shape. The body whorl has a median cylindrical area, angled above and below. The keel along the lower angle is buried by the suture of the following whorl, that along the upper angle projects more and ascends the spire to the protoconch, where it suddenly ceases. Above the upper keel the whorl slopes to the suture, below the lower the base is concavely excavated. The colour of the shell is pale yellow. It contains four whorls, plus the protoconch. These whorls are wound obliquely..The topmost whorl is undulated by about sixteen broad radial ribs, which disappear on the next whorl. Fine and coarse spiral threads alternate over the whole surface, and are crossed by fine growth lines. The protoconch is exsert, white, smooth and two-whorled. The aperture is broad. The outer lip is simple. There is no apparent sinus. The short siphonal canal is open and straight.

== Distribution ==
This marine species is endemic to Australia and occurs off New South Wales, Queensland, Tasmania and Victoria.
