= Anacithara levukensis =

Scientific classification
- Kingdom: Animalia
- Phylum: Mollusca
- Class: Gastropoda
- Subclass: Caenogastropoda
- Order: Neogastropoda
- Superfamily: Conoidea
- Family: Horaiclavidae
- Genus: Anacithara
- Species: A. levukensis

Binomial name
- Anacithara levukensis (Watson, 1881)

Synonyms
- Mangilia levukensis Watson, 1881; Pleurotoma (Mangelia) levukensis Watson, 1881 (original combination)

Species of gastropod

Anacithara levukensis is a species of sea snail, a marine gastropod mollusk in the family Horaiclavidae.

== Description ==
(Original description) The length of the shell attains 5.5 mm, its diameter 2.5 mm. This species extremely resembles Haedropleura septangularis (Montagu, 1803)., in general appearance and in sculpture, both as regards ribs and the fine spiral striae. In form it is smaller, narrower, and much more cylindrical. The body whorl is similarly tumid; but it and the aperture sare till more shorter.;The penultimate whorl is very much smaller and especially is narrower; while the upper whorls are broader, and the apex very much broader and blunter. The specimen is in too bad condition for detailed description.

== Distribution ==
This marine species occurs off Levuka, Fiji.
