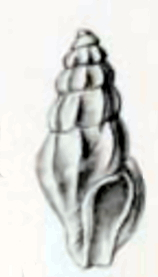
- Original image of a shell of Anacithara querna

Scientific classification
- Kingdom: Animalia
- Phylum: Mollusca
- Class: Gastropoda
- Subclass: Caenogastropoda
- Order: Neogastropoda
- Superfamily: Conoidea
- Family: Horaiclavidae
- Genus: Anacithara
- Species: A. querna

Binomial name
- Anacithara querna (Melvill, 1910)

Synonyms
- Mangilia querna Melvill, 1910 (original combination)

= Anacithara querna =

Species of gastropod

Anacithara querna is a species of sea snail, a marine gastropod mollusk in the family Horaiclavidae.

== Description ==
(Original description) The length of the shell attains 5.5 mm, its diameter 2 mm. A thickened pale brown or straw-coloured shell with few ribs, the number only extending to nine on the body whorl. Altogether it is seven-whorled, two of these being apical. The outer lip is thickened. No trace of sinus is perceptible. The columella is straight. The siphonal canal is very short.

== Distribution ==
This marine species occurs off Iran
