= Nquma scalpta =

Scientific classification
- Kingdom: Animalia
- Phylum: Mollusca
- Class: Gastropoda
- Subclass: Caenogastropoda
- Order: Neogastropoda
- Superfamily: Conoidea
- Family: Horaiclavidae
- Genus: Nquma
- Species: N. scalpta

Binomial name
- Nquma scalpta Kilburn, 1988

Species of gastropod

Nquma scalpta is a species of sea snail, a marine gastropod mollusk in the family Horaiclavidae.

== Description ==
The length of the shell varies between 10 mm and 15 mm.

== Distribution ==
This marine species occurs off East London, South Africa, and off Mozambique.
