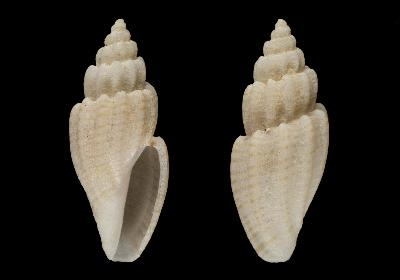
- Shell of Anacithara punctostriata (holotype at MNHN, Paris)

Scientific classification
- Kingdom: Animalia
- Phylum: Mollusca
- Class: Gastropoda
- Subclass: Caenogastropoda
- Order: Neogastropoda
- Superfamily: Conoidea
- Family: Horaiclavidae
- Genus: Anacithara
- Species: A. punctostriata

Binomial name
- Anacithara punctostriata Bozzetti, 2009

= Anacithara punctostriata =

Species of gastropod

Anacithara punctostriata is a species of sea snail, a marine gastropod mollusk in the family Horaiclavidae.

== Description ==
The length of the shell attains 10.5 mm.

== Distribution ==
This marine species occurs off Madagascar
