= Anacithara platycheila =

Scientific classification
- Kingdom: Animalia
- Phylum: Mollusca
- Class: Gastropoda
- Subclass: Caenogastropoda
- Order: Neogastropoda
- Superfamily: Conoidea
- Family: Horaiclavidae
- Genus: Anacithara
- Species: A. platycheila

Binomial name
- Anacithara platycheila (E. A. Smith, 1882)

Synonyms
- Pleurotoma (Mangilia) platycheila E. A. Smith, 1882 (original combination); Pleurotoma platycheila E. A. Smith, 1882 (original combination)

Species of gastropod

Anacithara platycheila is a species of sea snail, a marine gastropod mollusk in the family Horaiclavidae.

== Description ==
The length of the ovate, dirty white shell attains 6.5 mm, its diameter 2 2/3 mm. It contains 6 1/2 whorls. The outer lip is conspicuously thin, very dilated laterally and slightly sinuate on top. The columella has a slight callus. The open siphonal canal is very short. The single reddish-brown band around the body whorl and the broadly expanded lip at once mark the distinctness of this species. The maculations near the suture are about three on a whorl.
