= Striatoguraleus electrinus =

Scientific classification
- Kingdom: Animalia
- Phylum: Mollusca
- Class: Gastropoda
- Subclass: Caenogastropoda
- Order: Neogastropoda
- Superfamily: Conoidea
- Family: Horaiclavidae
- Genus: Striatoguraleus
- Species: S. electrinus

Binomial name
- Striatoguraleus electrinus Kilburn, 1994

Species of gastropod

Striatoguraleus electrinus is a species of sea snail, a marine gastropod mollusk in the family Horaiclavidae.

== Description ==
The length of the cylindric-fusiform shell attains 4.2 mm.

== Distribution ==
This marine species occurs off Transkei, South Africa.
