= Anacithara pupiformis =

Scientific classification
- Kingdom: Animalia
- Phylum: Mollusca
- Class: Gastropoda
- Subclass: Caenogastropoda
- Order: Neogastropoda
- Superfamily: Conoidea
- Family: Horaiclavidae
- Genus: Anacithara
- Species: A. pupiformis

Binomial name
- Anacithara pupiformis Barros, Santana & Lima, 2015

Synonyms
- Anacithara pupiforme Barros, Santana & Lima, 2015 (incorrect gender agreement of specific epithet)

Species of gastropod

Anacithara pupiformis is a species of sea snails, a marine gastropod mollusc in the family Horaiclavidae.

== Distribution ==
This marine species occurs in the Atlantic Ocean off Rio Grande do Norte, Brazil.
