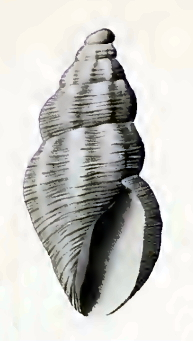
- Original image of a shell of Anacithara tumida

Scientific classification
- Kingdom: Animalia
- Phylum: Mollusca
- Class: Gastropoda
- Subclass: Caenogastropoda
- Order: Neogastropoda
- Superfamily: Conoidea
- Family: Horaiclavidae
- Genus: Anacithara
- Species: A. tumida

Binomial name
- Anacithara tumida Hedley, 1922

= Anacithara tumida =

Species of gastropod

Anacithara tumida is a species of sea snail, a marine gastropod mollusk in the family Horaiclavidae.

== Description ==
The length of the shell attains 5.3 mm, its diameter 2 mm.

(Original description) The ovate shell is thin. Its colour is uniform white, or white with narrow ochraceous spiral lines. It contains six inflated whorls, including the protoconch, which is smooth, subdiscoidal, tilted to one side, and projecting over the next whorl. The ribs are broad and rounded, well spaced, discontinuous from one whorl to another, nine on the penultimate whorl, gradually vanishing towards the base. Both ribs and interstices overrun by fine dense spiral threads. The aperture is wide. The lip is simple.

== Distribution ==
This marine species is endemic to Australia and occurs off Queensland.
