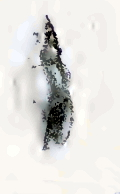
- Original image of a shell of Anacithara ione

Scientific classification
- Kingdom: Animalia
- Phylum: Mollusca
- Class: Gastropoda
- Subclass: Caenogastropoda
- Order: Neogastropoda
- Superfamily: Conoidea
- Family: Horaiclavidae
- Genus: Anacithara
- Species: A. ione

Binomial name
- Anacithara ione (Melvill & Standen, 1896)

Synonyms
- Drillia ione Melvill & Standen, 1896; Mangilia ione (Melvill & Standen, 1896) superseded combination

= Anacithara ione =

Species of gastropod

Anacithara ione is a species of sea snail, a marine gastropod mollusk in the family Horaiclavidae.

== Description ==
A chaste pale violet species, with occasional brown dorsal shading. Sometimes, indeed, the ground colour is pale-brown or ochre, while other specimens are pure white The length of the small shell attains 5 mm, its diameter 3 mm. The shell has a thickened fusiform build. It is longitudinally thickly costate, the ribs few in number. The shell contains seven or eight whorls, slightly ventricose, uniformly spirally lirate. The interstices when viewed with a lens are beautifully decussate. The aperture is wide. The outer lip is thickened, transversely striate, as are the whorls. The columellar margin is simple. The short siphonal canal is wide.

== Distribution ==
This marine species occurs off the Loyalty Islands.
