= Anacithara maltzani =

Scientific classification
- Kingdom: Animalia
- Phylum: Mollusca
- Class: Gastropoda
- Subclass: Caenogastropoda
- Order: Neogastropoda
- Superfamily: Conoidea
- Family: Horaiclavidae
- Genus: Anacithara
- Species: A. maltzani

Binomial name
- Anacithara maltzani (Knudsen, 1952)

Synonyms
- Haedropleura maltzani Knudsen, 1952 (original combination)

Species of gastropod

Anacithara maltzani is a species of sea snail, a marine gastropod mollusk in the family Horaiclavidae.

== Distribution ==
This marine species occurs in the Atlantic Ocean off Guinea
