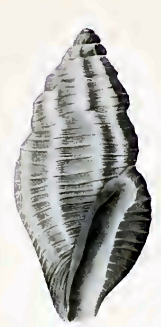
- Original image of a shell of Anacithara robusta

Scientific classification
- Kingdom: Animalia
- Phylum: Mollusca
- Class: Gastropoda
- Subclass: Caenogastropoda
- Order: Neogastropoda
- Superfamily: Conoidea
- Family: Horaiclavidae
- Genus: Anacithara
- Species: A. robusta

Binomial name
- Anacithara robusta Hedley, 1922

= Anacithara robusta =

Species of gastropod

Anacithara robusta is a species of sea snail, a marine gastropod mollusk in the family Horaiclavidae.

== Description ==
The length of the shell attains 5.5 mm, its diameter 2 mm.

(Original description) The small, solid shell has a biconical shape. Its colour is dull white, the apex pink. It contains six whorls, including the protoconch. The ribs are prominent, discontinuous from whorl to whorl, projecting at the periphery and gradually vanishing on the base. They number nine on the penultimate whorl. Very many and close spiral threads overrun both ribs and interstices. Two spirals, larger and wider spaced than the rest, traverse the periphery and ascend the spire. The aperture is protected by a thick varix, from which a free limb, insinuate at the base, projects into the aperture. The sinus is semicircular. The siphonal canal is short and open.

== Distribution ==
This marine species is endemic to Australia and occurs off Queensland.
