= Striatoguraleus thetis =

Scientific classification
- Kingdom: Animalia
- Phylum: Mollusca
- Class: Gastropoda
- Subclass: Caenogastropoda
- Order: Neogastropoda
- Superfamily: Conoidea
- Family: Horaiclavidae
- Genus: Striatoguraleus
- Species: S. thetis

Binomial name
- Striatoguraleus thetis (E.A. Smith, 1904)

Synonyms
- Antiguraleus thetis (E. A. Smith, 1904); Drillia albanyana Turton, W.H., 1932; Drillia pretiosa Turton, W.H., 1932; Drillia thetis E.A. Smith, 1904 (original combination)

Species of gastropod

Striatoguraleus thetis is a species of sea snail, a marine gastropod mollusk in the family Horaiclavidae.

== Description ==
The length of the claviform shell attains 12 mm. The smooth protoconch consists of 1½-2 whorls. The teleoconch contains 5 whorls, convex from suture to suture (no concave sulcus). The suture is not distinctly crenulated, as in the other species in this genus. The sculpture consists of oblique opisthocline axial ribs, 11 on the first whorl, increasing to 12–13 on the body whorl, from suture to suture, and obsolescent on the base. The shell shows fine spiral striae 6–7 on the first whorl, increasing to about. 25 (between sutures) on the body whorl, crossing the ribs. No cingulum. The outer lip sinus is deep, with a thick, smooth parietal callus in the adult. The aperture is rather oblong. The straight columella is reflected at the short and broad siphonal canal. The color of the shell varies from white or lilac to orange.

== Distribution ==
This marine species occurs off Jeffrey's Bay - Northeast Cape Town, South Africa
