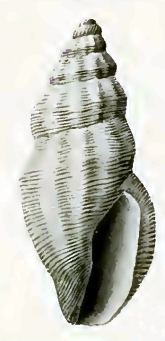
- Original image of a shell of Anacithara hebes

Scientific classification
- Kingdom: Animalia
- Phylum: Mollusca
- Class: Gastropoda
- Subclass: Caenogastropoda
- Order: Neogastropoda
- Superfamily: Conoidea
- Family: Horaiclavidae
- Genus: Anacithara
- Species: A. hebes

Binomial name
- Anacithara hebes Hedley, 1922

= Anacithara hebes =

Species of gastropod

Anacithara hebes is a species of sea snail, a marine gastropod mollusk in the family Horaiclavidae.

== Description ==
The length of the shell attains 5.5 mm, its diameter 2 mm.

(Original description) The small, solid shell has a biconical shape. Its colour is uniform white. It contains six whorls, angled at the shoulder. It shows low, rounded, and close-set ribs. They number eleven on the penultimate whorl, and become evanescent on the body whorl. The spirals are close fine threads, nearly uniform in size and spacing, crossing ribs and interstices alike, and extending over the whole whorl from the suture downwards, numbering about six on the penultimate whorl and twenty-two on the body whorl. The wide aperture is unarmed. The varix is slight. The sinus is shallow. The siphonal canal is a mere notch.

== Distribution ==
This marine species is endemic to Australia and occurs off Queensland.
