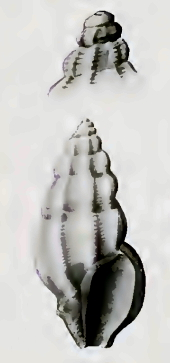
- Original image of a shell of Graciliclava costata

Scientific classification
- Kingdom: Animalia
- Phylum: Mollusca
- Class: Gastropoda
- Subclass: Caenogastropoda
- Order: Neogastropoda
- Superfamily: Conoidea
- Family: Horaiclavidae
- Genus: Graciliclava
- Species: G. costata

Binomial name
- Graciliclava costata (Hedley, 1922)

Synonyms
- Austroclavus costatus. Cotton, B.C. 1947; Clavus costatus Hedley, 1922

= Graciliclava costata =

Species of gastropod

Graciliclava costata is a species of sea snail, a marine gastropod mollusk in the family Horaiclavidae.

It was previously included within the family Turridae.

== Description ==
The length of the shell varies between 5 mm and 10 mm.

(Original description) The small, solid and compact shell has an ovate-elongate shape. Its colour is dull white, the summit buff-yellow, base anterior to the insertion of the lip pale orange-yellow. Along the suture are irregular chocolate splashes. The shell contains 7 whorls including a protoconch of two depressed whorls. Its sculpture consists of eight thick and prominent ribs to a whorl These descend the shell vertically and continuously; on the base they are slightly flexed, and each terminates anteriorly in a bead. Both ribs and interstices are engraved by very minute and dense spiral striae. The snout is traversed by a few coarse spirals, which cease at the bead row. On the smooth glossy protoconch is a pronounced median keel, which ends abruptly at the topmost rib. The aperture is pyriform and produced into a short, wide, open siphonal canal. Behind the lip is a prominent varix which, rising above the suture, fills an intervariceal space on the preceding whorl. A substantial callus sheet spreads on the inner lip, and a tubercle is formed near the right insertion. Just in front of the siphonal canal is a slight insinuation of the outer lip.

== Distribution ==
This marine species occurs off Queensland, Australia and the Philippines
