= Anacithara goodingii =

Scientific classification
- Kingdom: Animalia
- Phylum: Mollusca
- Class: Gastropoda
- Subclass: Caenogastropoda
- Order: Neogastropoda
- Superfamily: Conoidea
- Family: Horaiclavidae
- Genus: Anacithara
- Species: A. goodingii

Binomial name
- Anacithara goodingii (E. A. Smith, 1884)

Synonyms
- Pleurotoma (Mangilia) goodingii E. A. Smith, 1884 (original combination); Pleurotoma goodingii E. A. Smith, 1884 (original combination)

Species of gastropod

Anacithara goodingii is a species of sea snail, a marine gastropod mollusk in the family Horaiclavidae.

== Description ==
The length of the acuminate-ovate, white shell attains 7.5 mm, its diameter 2 2/3 mm. It contains 7 whorls. The aperture is narrow. The outer lip is thickened and slightly sinuate. The siphonal canal is short and narrow. The fine prominent plicate ribs (numbering 9–10) are continuous up the spire. The ribs are spirally marked with minute, dense striations. The spiral row of reddish dots on the ribs, two on the upper whorls and three on the body whorl, are the principal distinctive characters of this species.

== Distribution ==
This marine species is endemic to New Zealand and occurs off Ninety Mile Beach, North Island.
