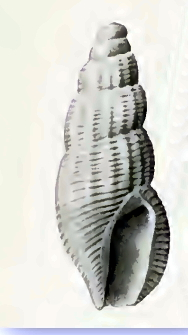
- Original image of a shell of Anacithara stricta

Scientific classification
- Kingdom: Animalia
- Phylum: Mollusca
- Class: Gastropoda
- Subclass: Caenogastropoda
- Order: Neogastropoda
- Superfamily: Conoidea
- Family: Horaiclavidae
- Genus: Anacithara
- Species: A. stricta

Binomial name
- Anacithara stricta Hedley, 1922

= Anacithara stricta =

Species of gastropod

Anacithara stricta is a species of sea snail, a marine gastropod mollusk in the family Horaiclavidae.

== Description ==
The length of the shell attains 4.5 mm, its diameter 1.5 mm.

(Original description) The subcylindrical shell is blunt at either end. Its colour is uniform pale buff. It contains 5½ whorls. The protoconch is depressed and asymmetrical. The ribs are slight and inconspicuous, their own breadth apart, those on the body whorl descending from the suture only to the periphery. They number fourteen on the penultimate whorl, and as many on the body whorl. These are dominated by the spirals, which are coarse, wide-spaced, and amount to eighteen on the body whorl. The aperture is wide and unarmed. The varix is slight. The sinus is indistinct. The siphonal canal is short and wide.

== Distribution ==
This marine species is endemic to Australia and occurs off Queensland.
