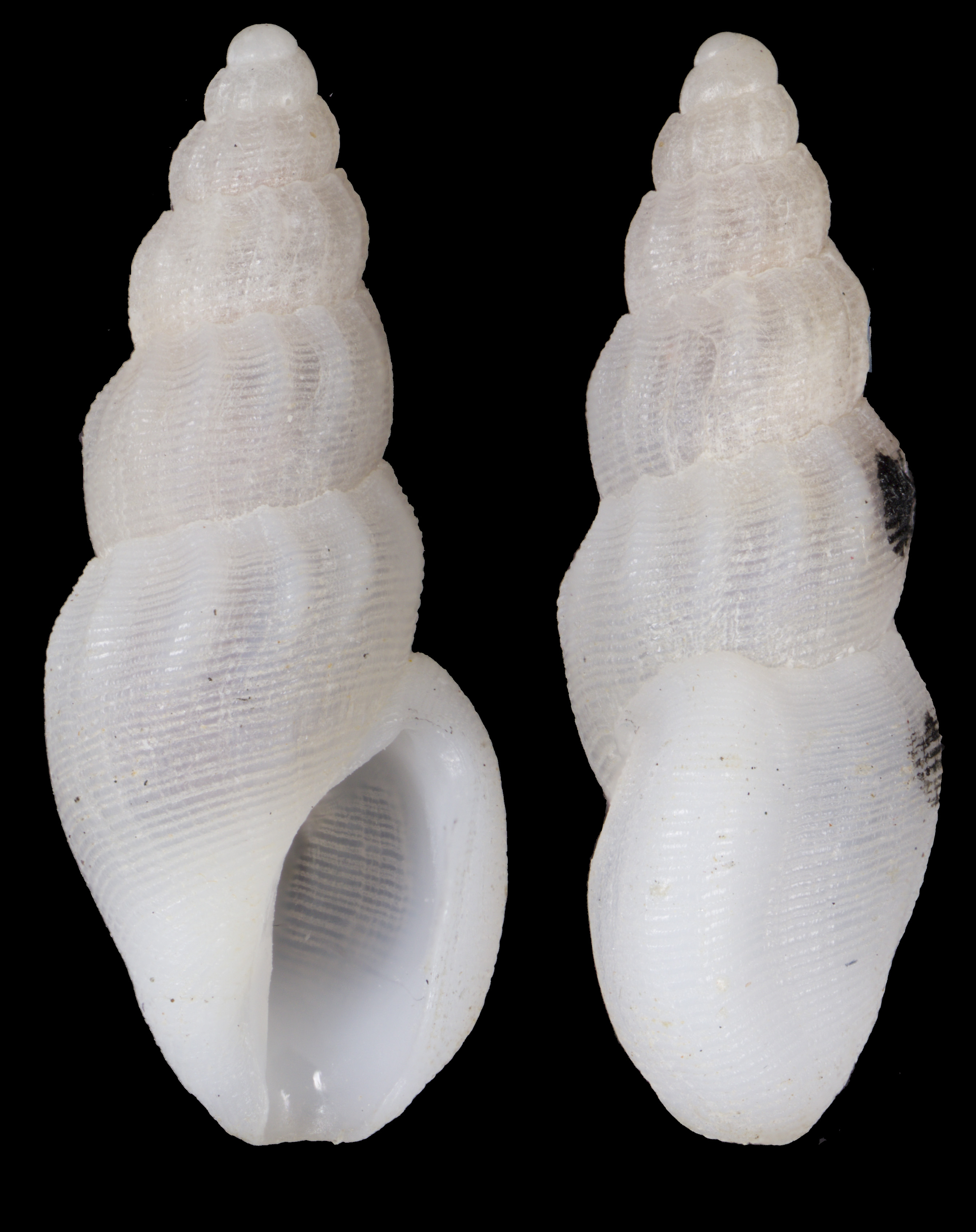
- Shell of Anacithara pseudorissoina (holotype at MNHN, Paris)

Scientific classification
- Kingdom: Animalia
- Phylum: Mollusca
- Class: Gastropoda
- Subclass: Caenogastropoda
- Order: Neogastropoda
- Superfamily: Conoidea
- Family: Horaiclavidae
- Genus: Anacithara
- Species: A. pseudorissoina

Binomial name
- Anacithara pseudorissoina Horro, Gori, Rosado & Rolán, 2021

= Anacithara pseudorissoina =

Species of gastropod

Anacithara pseudorissoina is a species of sea snail, a marine gastropod mollusk in the family Horaiclavidae.

== Description ==
The length of this shell attains 6.48 mm.

== Distribution ==
This marine species occurs off Oman.
