= Naskia axiplicata =

Scientific classification
- Kingdom: Animalia
- Phylum: Mollusca
- Class: Gastropoda
- Subclass: Caenogastropoda
- Order: Neogastropoda
- Superfamily: Conoidea
- Family: Horaiclavidae
- Genus: Naskia
- Species: N. axiplicata

Binomial name
- Naskia axiplicata Sysoev & Ivanov, 1985

Species of gastropod

Naskia axiplicata is a species of sea snail, a marine gastropod mollusk in the family Horaiclavidae.

== Distribution ==
This marine species occurs on seamounts in the Naska Ridge, Southeast Pacific Ocean.
