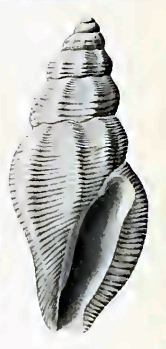
- Original image of a shell of Anacithara caelatura

Scientific classification
- Kingdom: Animalia
- Phylum: Mollusca
- Class: Gastropoda
- Subclass: Caenogastropoda
- Order: Neogastropoda
- Superfamily: Conoidea
- Family: Horaiclavidae
- Genus: Anacithara
- Species: A. caelatura

Binomial name
- Anacithara caelatura Hedley, 1922

= Anacithara caelatura =

Species of gastropod

Anacithara caelatura is a species of sea snail, a marine gastropod mollusk in the family Horaiclavidae.

== Description ==
The length of the shell attains 4.5 mm, its diameter 2 mm.

(Original description) The small, rather solid shell has a fusiform shape. Its colour is buff, with an indistinct pale ferruginous band on the shoulder. It contains six whorls, rounded above, constricted at the sutures, and contracted at the base. The ribs are perpendicular, narrow, widely spaced, not continuing from whorl to whorl. The number nine on the penultimate whorl, on the body whorl eight. Fine even close-set spirals overrun the whole shell. The wide aperture is unarmed. The varix is high and broad. The sinus is wide and rather deep. The siphonal canal is short and broad.

== Distribution ==
This marine species is endemic to Australia and occurs off Queensland.
