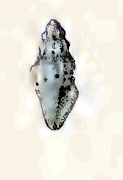
- Original image of a shell of Anacithara dulcinea

Scientific classification
- Kingdom: Animalia
- Phylum: Mollusca
- Class: Gastropoda
- Subclass: Caenogastropoda
- Order: Neogastropoda
- Superfamily: Conoidea
- Family: Horaiclavidae
- Genus: Anacithara
- Species: A. dulcinea

Binomial name
- Anacithara dulcinea (Melvill & Standen, 1895)

Synonyms
- Mangilia (Daphnella) dulcinea Melvill & Standen, 1895 (original combination)

= Anacithara dulcinea =

Species of gastropod

Anacithara dulcinea is a species of sea snail, a marine gastropod mollusk in the family Horaiclavidae.

== Description ==
The length of the ovate, dirty white shell attains 6 mm, its diameter 2.5 mm. A white, fusiform, very delicately-striated shell, with six swollen whorls, impressed at the sutures, obscurely longitudinally ribbed. The aperture is oblong. The outer lip is effuse. Under a lens the surface is seen to be very finely besprinkled with minute dust-like brown spots.

== Distribution ==
This marine species occurs off Lifu, the Loyalty Islands.
