= Anacithara undaticosta =

Scientific classification
- Kingdom: Animalia
- Phylum: Mollusca
- Class: Gastropoda
- Subclass: Caenogastropoda
- Order: Neogastropoda
- Superfamily: Conoidea
- Family: Horaiclavidae
- Genus: Anacithara
- Species: A. undaticosta

Binomial name
- Anacithara undaticosta (Reeve, 1845)

Synonyms
- Mangelia undaticosta Brazier, 1876; Pleurotoma undaticosta Reeve, 1845 (original combination)

Species of gastropod

Anacithara undaticosta is a species of sea snail, a marine gastropod mollusc in the family Horaiclavidae.

In 1994 R.N. Kilburn disputed the attribution by Charles Hedley (1922) of Pleurotoma undaticostata Reeve, 1845 to the genus Anacithara, because the original figure by Reeve showed a shell that is too fusiform, and lacked further detail. The holotype of this species as described by Reeve is lost, making it impossible to describe this species accurately.

== Description ==
The length of the shell attains 9.5 mm.

The whitish shell has a fusiform shape. The, whorls are slightly shouldered, with longitudinal, waved ribs.

== Distribution ==
This marine species is endemic to Australia and occurs off Queensland.
