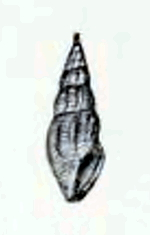
- Original image of a shell of Anacithara osumiensis

Scientific classification
- Kingdom: Animalia
- Phylum: Mollusca
- Class: Gastropoda
- Subclass: Caenogastropoda
- Order: Neogastropoda
- Superfamily: Conoidea
- Family: Horaiclavidae
- Genus: Anacithara
- Species: A. osumiensis

Binomial name
- Anacithara osumiensis (G. B. Sowerby III, 1913)

Synonyms
- Mangilia osumiensis G. B. Sowerby III, 1913 (original combination)

= Anacithara osumiensis =

Species of gastropod

Anacithara osumiensis is a species of sea snail, a marine gastropod mollusc in the family Horaiclavidae.

R.N. Kilburn disputed in 1994 that Mangilia osumiensis should belong to the genus Anacithara, as it shows features that are unknown in Anacithara, such as two vestigial folds on the inner lip.

== Description ==
The length of the shell attains 4.5 mm, its diameter 2 mm.

(Original description in Latin) The shell is fusiform, dirty whitish, and banded with dull yellow. Its spire is elevated and acute. There are 7 somewhat convex whorls, densely striated spirally and longitudinally plicate. The 8 folds are rather straight or slightly oblique and are somewhat thick. The body whorl surpasses the spire, is convex above, and attenuates below. The aperture is oblong and moderately wide. The peristome is sharp. The sinus is very short, and the siphonal canal is rather wide and short.

== Distribution ==
This marine species occurs off the coasts of Japan.
