= Pseudexomilus fuscoapicatus =

Scientific classification
- Kingdom: Animalia
- Phylum: Mollusca
- Class: Gastropoda
- Subclass: Caenogastropoda
- Order: Neogastropoda
- Superfamily: Conoidea
- Family: Horaiclavidae
- Genus: Pseudexomilus
- Species: P. fuscoapicatus

Binomial name
- Pseudexomilus fuscoapicatus Morassi, 1997

Species of gastropod

Pseudexomilus fuscoapicatus is a species of sea snail, a marine gastropod mollusk in the family Horaiclavidae, the turrids.

== Description ==
The length of the shell attains 16 mm.

== Distribution ==
This marine species occurs in the Indian Ocean off Somalia.
