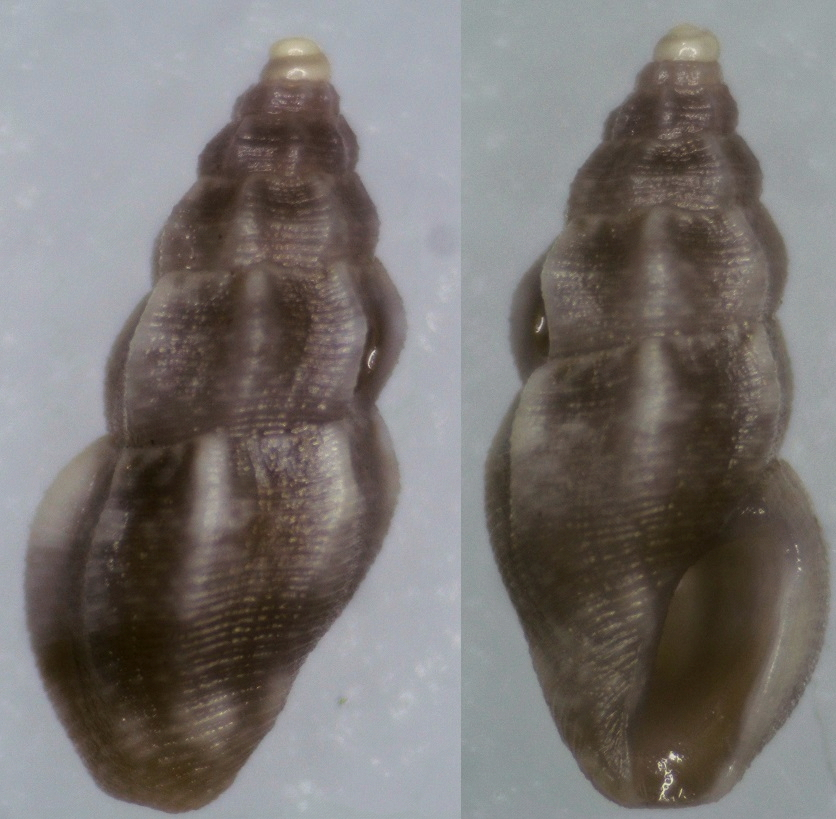
- Two views of a shell of Anacithara modica

Scientific classification
- Kingdom: Animalia
- Phylum: Mollusca
- Class: Gastropoda
- Subclass: Caenogastropoda
- Order: Neogastropoda
- Superfamily: Conoidea
- Family: Horaiclavidae
- Genus: Anacithara
- Species: A. modica

Binomial name
- Anacithara modica (E. A. Smith, 1882)

Synonyms
- Pleurotoma (Mangilia) modica E. A. Smith, 1882 (original combination); Pleurotoma modica E. A. Smith, 1882 (original combination)

= Anacithara modica =

Species of gastropod

Anacithara modica is a species of sea snail, a marine gastropod mollusk in the family Horaiclavidae.

== Description ==
The length of the ovate-fusiform, pink to purple, semitransparent shell attains 6 mm, its diameter 2½ mm. It contains 6 whorls. The aperture is small. The outer lip is much thickened and slightly sinuate on top..The columella has a slight callus. The wide siphonal canal is very short.

== Distribution ==
This marine species occurs off Japan and the Philippines.
