= Anacithara biscoitoi =

Scientific classification
- Kingdom: Animalia
- Phylum: Mollusca
- Class: Gastropoda
- Subclass: Caenogastropoda
- Order: Neogastropoda
- Superfamily: Conoidea
- Family: Horaiclavidae
- Genus: Anacithara
- Species: A. biscoitoi

Binomial name
- Anacithara biscoitoi Nolf & Swinnen, 2011

Species of gastropod

Anacithara biscoitoi is a species of sea snail, a marine gastropod mollusk in the family Horaiclavidae.

== Distribution ==
This marine species occurs in the Atlantic Ocean off Western Sahara.
