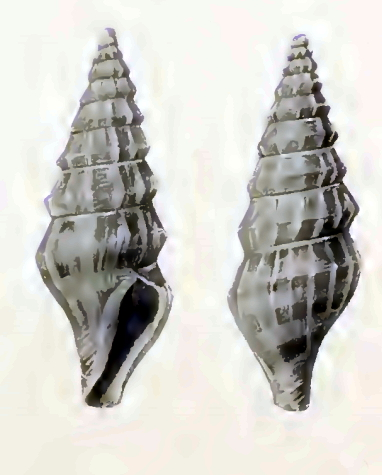
- Original image of a shell of Anguloclavus multicostatus

Scientific classification
- Kingdom: Animalia
- Phylum: Mollusca
- Class: Gastropoda
- Subclass: Caenogastropoda
- Order: Neogastropoda
- Superfamily: Conoidea
- Family: Horaiclavidae
- Genus: Anguloclavus
- Species: A. multicostatus

Binomial name
- Anguloclavus multicostatus (Schepman, 1913)

Synonyms
- Horaiclavus (Anguloclavus) multicostatus (Schepman, 1913); Horaiclavus multicostatus (Schepman, 1913); Mangilia multicostata Schepman, 1913

= Anguloclavus multicostatus =

Species of gastropod

Anguloclavus multicostatus is a species of sea snail, a marine gastropod mollusk in the family Horaiclavidae.

It was previously included within the family Turridae.

== Description ==
The length of the shell attains 11 mm, its diameter 4 mm.

(Original description) (The described shell is evidently not quite adult) The shell is fusiform, with a pyramidal spire and a short siphonal canal. The shell is thin, smooth, shining, yellowish-white with red-brown blotches in three more or less interrupted bands. The shell contains 9 whorls, of which about 2 form a smooth, convexly-whorled nucleus. The post-nuclear whorls are sharply angular. Their upper part is slightly concave and occupies about two thirds of each whorl. The sculpture consists of numerous, sharp axial ribs, 16 in number on the body whorl, with pointed tubercles at the angle, connected by a rather faint spiral..Moreover, there are very faint growth lines and spiral striae, more conspicuous on the base of the body whorl, especially on the ribs, and a few stronger ones on the siphonal canal. The aperture is oval, angular above, with a short, broad siphonal canal below. The peristome is broken, probably with very shallow sinus above. The columellar margin is concave above, directed to the left below along the siphonal canal, with a thin layer of enamel.

== Distribution ==
This marine species occurs in the Mozambique Channel and off Madagascar; also off Indonesia, New Caledonia, Papua New Guinea and in the Bismarck Sea.
