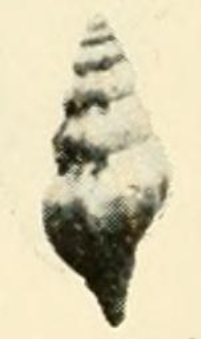
- Shell of † Anacithara axialis (holotype)

Scientific classification
- Kingdom: Animalia
- Phylum: Mollusca
- Class: Gastropoda
- Subclass: Caenogastropoda
- Order: Neogastropoda
- Superfamily: Conoidea
- Family: Horaiclavidae
- Genus: Anacithara
- Species: †A. axialis

Binomial name
- †Anacithara axialis (P. Marshall, 1918)

= Anacithara axialis =

Extinct species of gastropod

Anacithara axialis is an extinct species of sea snail, a marine gastropod mollusk in the family Horaiclavidae.

== Description ==
(Original description) The shell is small and fusiform, measuring 6 mm by 2.5 mm. The spire consists of 5 strongly convex whorls. The aperture is oval, measuring more than one-third but less than one-half the length of the shell, and features a very short anterior siphonal canal. The outer lip is thick, and the columella is smooth.

Sculpture: strong axial ribs, numbering 12 on each whorl, are present. They are rounded and extend from suture to suture, and are bent slightly forward in the lower part, though broader in the middle than elsewhere. A large number of fine spiral lines are visible, which are more prominent in the interstices than on the ribs. The body whorl displays the same ornamentation, with the axial ribs extending almost to the end of the short siphonal canal. The protoconch consists of 3 perfectly smooth whorls.

== Distribution ==
This extinct marine species occurred off New Zealand.
