= Anacithara angulicostata =

Scientific classification
- Kingdom: Animalia
- Phylum: Mollusca
- Class: Gastropoda
- Subclass: Caenogastropoda
- Order: Neogastropoda
- Superfamily: Conoidea
- Family: Horaiclavidae
- Genus: Anacithara
- Species: A. angulicostata

Binomial name
- Anacithara angulicostata Kilburn, 1994

Species of gastropod

Anacithara angulicostata is a species of sea snail, a marine gastropod mollusk in the family Horaiclavidae.

== Description ==
The length of this violaceous-pink to yellow shell varies between 3.9 mm and 4.4 mm.

== Distribution ==
This marine species is endemic to South Africa and occurs off KwaZulu-Natal.
