= Striatoguraleus laticulmen =

Scientific classification
- Kingdom: Animalia
- Phylum: Mollusca
- Class: Gastropoda
- Subclass: Caenogastropoda
- Order: Neogastropoda
- Superfamily: Conoidea
- Family: Horaiclavidae
- Genus: Striatoguraleus
- Species: S. laticulmen

Binomial name
- Striatoguraleus laticulmen Kilburn, 1994

Species of gastropod

Striatoguraleus laticulmen is a species of sea snail, a marine gastropod mollusk in the family Horaiclavidae.

== Description ==
The length of the shell attains 4.2 mm, its diameter is 2 mm.

== Distribution ==
This marine species occurs off KwaZulu-Natal to Transkei, South Africa.
