= Anacithara minutistriata =

Scientific classification
- Kingdom: Animalia
- Phylum: Mollusca
- Class: Gastropoda
- Subclass: Caenogastropoda
- Order: Neogastropoda
- Superfamily: Conoidea
- Family: Horaiclavidae
- Genus: Anacithara
- Species: A. minutistriata

Binomial name
- Anacithara minutistriata (E. A. Smith, 1882)

Synonyms
- Pleurotoma (Mangilia) minutistriata E. A. Smith, 1882 (original combination); Pleurotoma minutistriata E. A. Smith, 1882 (original combination)

Species of mollusc

Anacithara minutistriata is a species of sea snail, a marine gastropod mollusk in the family Horaiclavidae.

== Description ==
The length of the ovate, dirty white, semitransparent shell attains 10.5 mm, its diameter 3½ mm. It contains 7½ whorls. The aperture is ovate. The outer lip is thickened close to the lowest rib and is hardly sinuate..The columella has a slight callus. The wide siphonal canal is very short.
