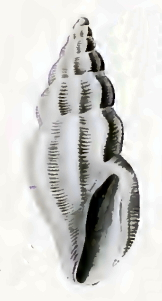
- Original image of a shell of Anacithara phyllidis

Scientific classification
- Kingdom: Animalia
- Phylum: Mollusca
- Class: Gastropoda
- Subclass: Caenogastropoda
- Order: Neogastropoda
- Superfamily: Conoidea
- Family: Horaiclavidae
- Genus: Anacithara
- Species: A. phyllidis

Binomial name
- Anacithara phyllidis (Hedley, 1922)

Synonyms
- Eucithara phyllidis Hedley, 1922

= Anacithara phyllidis =

Species of gastropod

Anacithara phyllidis is a species of sea snail, a marine gastropod mollusk in the family Horaiclavidae.

== Description ==
The length of the shell attains 7.5 mm, its diameter 3 mm.

(Original description) The small, solid shell has a fusiform shape. It is angled at the shoulder, contracted at the sutures and at the base. Its colour is crystalline white, with or without a dorsal blot and zone of ochraceous-orange only on the body whorl. It contains seven whorls, including a smooth helicoid tip. The radials are wide spaced, prominent, flexuous, perpendicular, and continuous ribs, which diminish at the shoulder and gradually vanish on the base. On the antepenultimate whorl there are ten, and on the body whorl eight, including the varix. The spirals are extremely fine and close threads, evenly distributed over the whole surface, and microscopically beaded. The aperture is vertical, and rather wide. From the varix a thin lip projects, curving forwards at the periphery, and followed beneath by an insinuation. Underneath the varix the throat is finely striated. The sinus is broad and shallow. The siphonal canal is short. On the inner lip a small tubercle rises opposite the sinus, and the columella is smooth.

== Distribution ==
This marine species occurs off Queensland, Australia, and off the Loyalty Islands.
