= Striatoguraleus vellicatus =

Scientific classification
- Kingdom: Animalia
- Phylum: Mollusca
- Class: Gastropoda
- Subclass: Caenogastropoda
- Order: Neogastropoda
- Superfamily: Conoidea
- Family: Horaiclavidae
- Genus: Striatoguraleus
- Species: S. vellicatus

Binomial name
- Striatoguraleus vellicatus Kilburn, 1994

Species of gastropod

Striatoguraleus vellicatus is a species of sea snail, a marine gastropod mollusk in the family Horaiclavidae.

== Description ==
The length of this nassariiform shell attains 6.6 mm. It differs from S. Himaeformis in that it lacks a brephic sculptural stage, and instead develops directly from the protoconch to axial and spiral sculpture.

== Distribution ==
This marine species occurs off Transkei, South Africa.
