= Anacithara perfecta =

Scientific classification
- Kingdom: Animalia
- Phylum: Mollusca
- Class: Gastropoda
- Subclass: Caenogastropoda
- Order: Neogastropoda
- Superfamily: Conoidea
- Family: Horaiclavidae
- Genus: Anacithara
- Species: A. perfecta

Binomial name
- Anacithara perfecta Kay, 1979

Species of gastropod

Anacithara perfecta is a species of sea snail, a marine gastropod mollusk in the family Horaiclavidae.

== Description ==
The length of the dark white, fusiform shell attains 3.5 mm.

== Distribution ==
This marine species occurs off Hawaii
