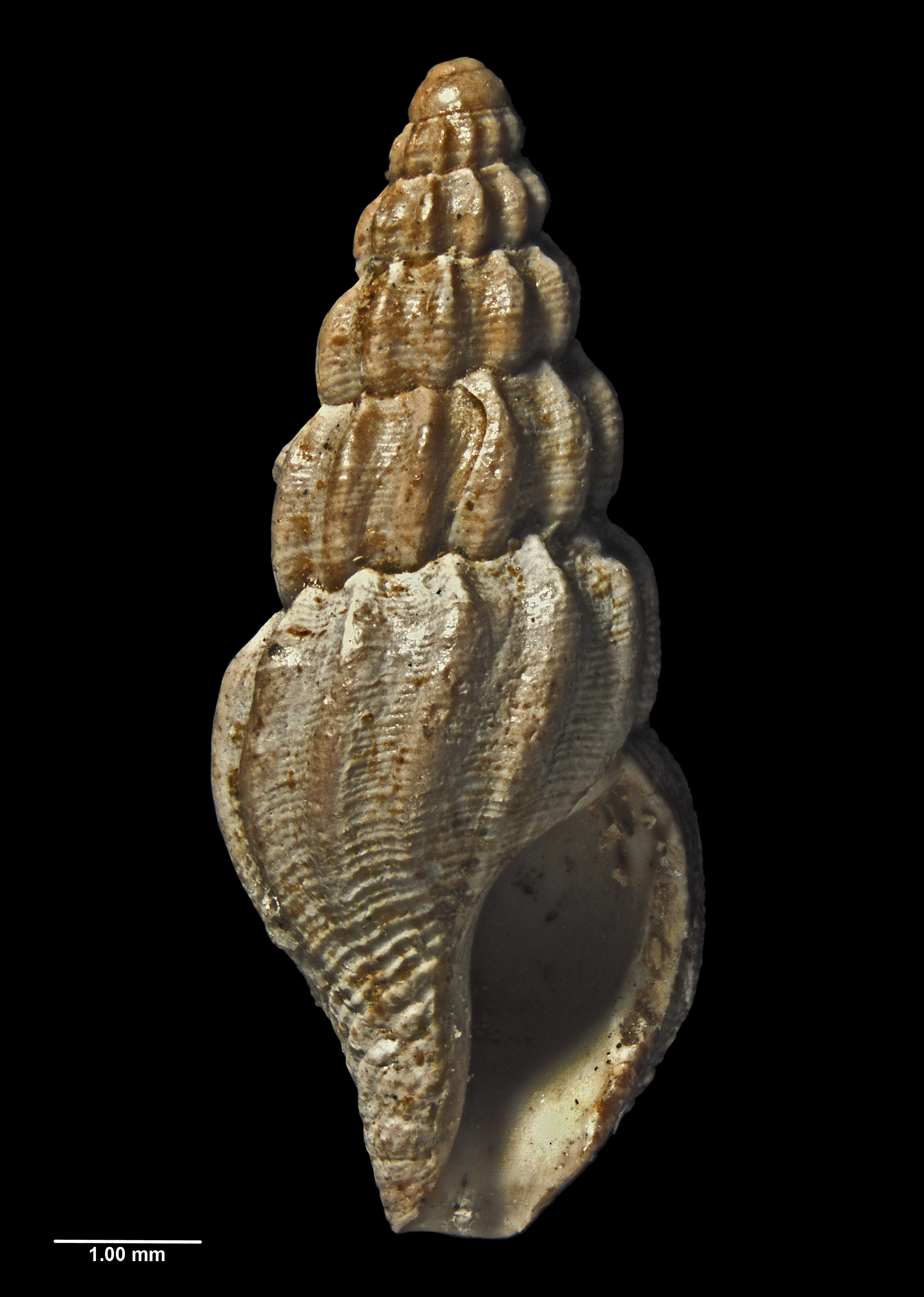
- Holotype of Anacithara janjukiensis from Auckland War Memorial Museum

Scientific classification
- Kingdom: Animalia
- Phylum: Mollusca
- Class: Gastropoda
- Subclass: Caenogastropoda
- Order: Neogastropoda
- Family: Horaiclavidae
- Genus: Anacithara
- Species: †A. janjukiensis

Binomial name
- †Anacithara janjukiensis Powell, 1944

= Anacithara janjukiensis =

Anacithara janjukiensis Temporal range: Early Miocene

Extinct species of gastropod

Anacithara janjukiensis is an extinct species of sea snail, a marine gastropod mollusk in the family Horaiclavidae. Fossils of the species date to the Early Miocene, and have been found in strata of the Bass Basin of Tasmania.

== Description ==
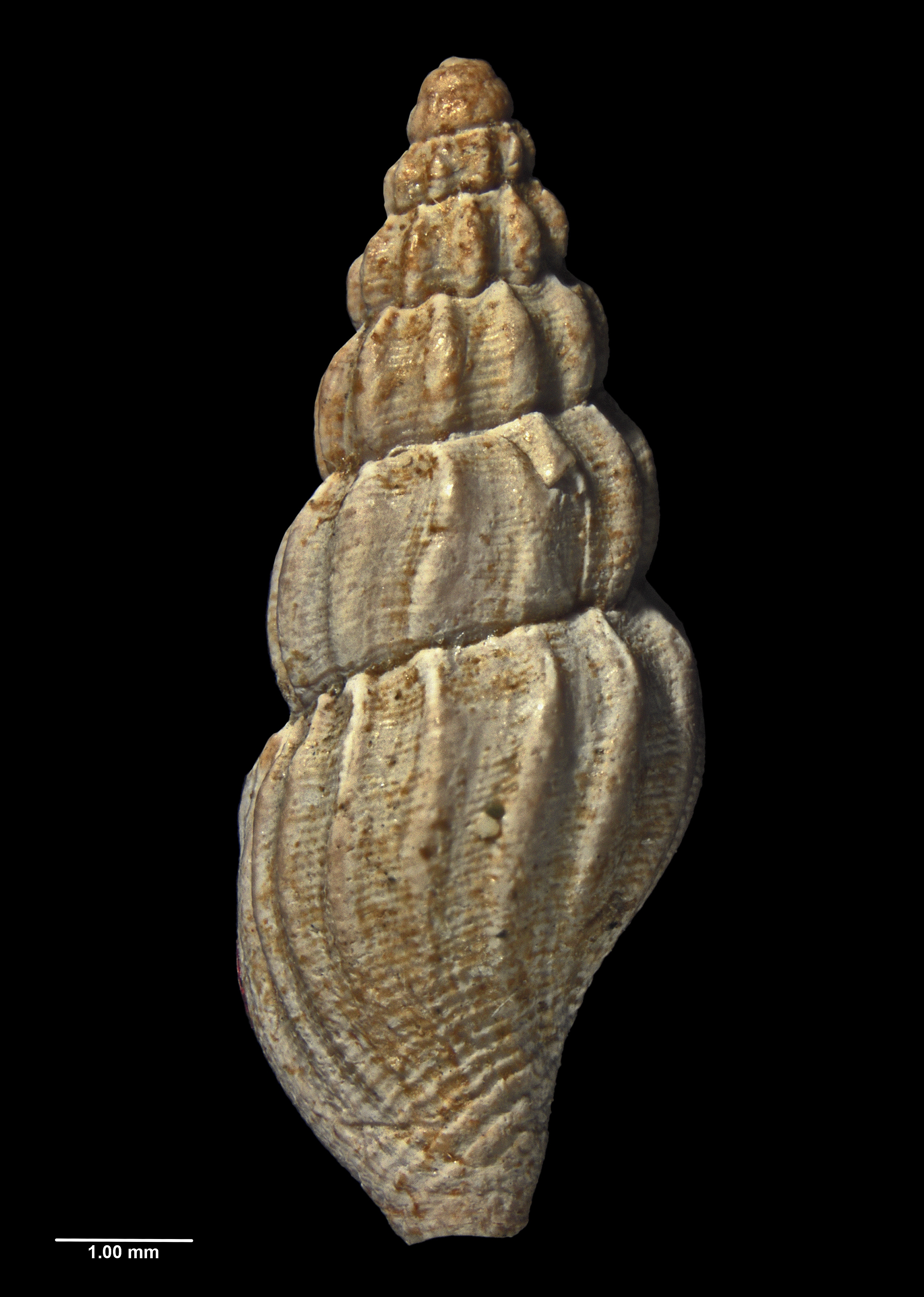
Reverse view of holotype

In the original description, Powell described the species' as follows:

Ovate-fusiform, with tall spire, robust. Whorls convex, slightly shouldered at two-thirds whorl height. Sculptured with broad, heavy, fold-like axials extending from upper suture over the base to the neck, 10 per whorl; crossed by dense regular lirations, about 25 on the penultimate. Outer lip thin at the edge, but heavily variced behind. Sinus shallow, arcuate, occupying the shoulder. There are no apertural processes.

The holotype of the species measures 8 mm (0.31 in) in height and 3.5 mm (0.14 in) in diameter.

== Taxonomy ==
The species was first described by A.W.B. Powell in 1944. The holotype was collected from Table Cape, Tasmania, at an unknown date earlier than 1944, and is held by the Auckland War Memorial Museum.

== Distribution ==
This extinct marine species occurs in early Miocene (Longfordian) strata of the Bass Basin, including the Freestone Cove Sandstone Formation and the Fossil Bluff Sandstone near Wynyard, Tasmania.
