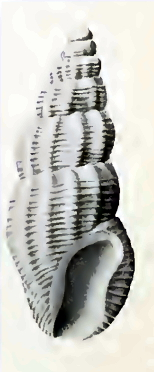
- Original image of a shell of Anacithara rissoina

Scientific classification
- Kingdom: Animalia
- Phylum: Mollusca
- Class: Gastropoda
- Subclass: Caenogastropoda
- Order: Neogastropoda
- Superfamily: Conoidea
- Family: Horaiclavidae
- Genus: Anacithara
- Species: A. rissoina

Binomial name
- Anacithara rissoina Hedley, 1922

= Anacithara rissoina =

Species of gastropod

Anacithara rissoina is a species of sea snail, a marine gastropod mollusk in the family Horaiclavidae.

== Description ==
The length of the shell attains 6 mm (0.24 in), its diameter 2 mm (0.079 in).

(Original description) The rather solid shell is elongate, rounded at the base and blunt at the apex. Its colour is dull white, with faint orange spots on the back of the body whorl. It contains six whorls, rounded and constricted at the sutures. The ribs are rounded and placed their breadth apart, alternate from whorl to whorl, undulate the suture, extend to the base, and number twelve on the penultimate whorl. The spirals are fine threads of uniform size and spacing, crossing both ribs and interstices, extending over the whole whorl except the fasciole area, numbering eight on the penultimate whorl and twenty on the body whorl. The wide aperture is unarmed. The varix is broad and high. The sinus is wide and shallow. The siphonal canal is a mere notch.

== Distribution ==
This marine species is endemic to Australia and occurs off Queensland.
