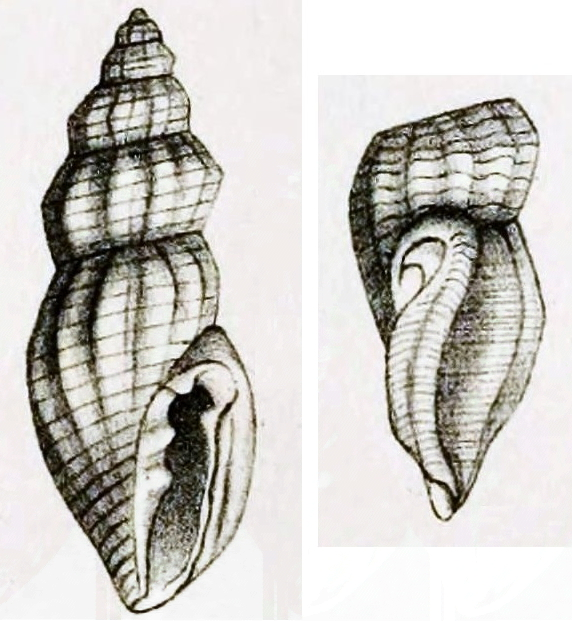
- Original images of a shell of Anacithara nanisca

Scientific classification
- Kingdom: Animalia
- Phylum: Mollusca
- Class: Gastropoda
- Subclass: Caenogastropoda
- Order: Neogastropoda
- Superfamily: Conoidea
- Family: Horaiclavidae
- Genus: Anacithara
- Species: A. nanisca

Binomial name
- Anacithara nanisca (Hervier, 1897)

Synonyms
- Mangilia nanisca Hervier, 1897

= Anacithara nanisca =

Species of gastropod

Anacithara nanisca is a species of sea snail, a marine gastropod mollusk in the family Horaiclavidae.

R.N. Kilburn disputed in 1994 that Mangilia nanisca should belong to the genus Anacithara, as it shows apertural features that are unknown in Anacithara, such as two median denticles in the inner lip and a posterior nodule on the outer lip.

== Description ==
(Original description in Latin) The shell is tiny, fusiform, white, and crystalline. Its spire is acuminated and turreted-pyramidal. It has 6-7 whorls: the 2 embryonic ones are smooth, round, and shiny; the intermediate ones are convex, constricted by an impressed suture, and more or less obtusely angled towards the middle. These whorls are longitudinally costulate, with 7 pyramidally arranged, obliquely directed, rather thick ribs. They are transversely elevated-striated, with minute, crowded, unequal striae surpassing the costulae, and several larger ones between them. The body whorl slightly exceeds half of the total length, is briefly angled, then convex, and attenuates towards the base, ending in a very short and truncated siphonal canal. On the dorsal part, between the penultimate and ultimate ribs, it is faintly spotted with reddish above.

The aperture is oblique, somewhat oblong, and white, with a continuous peristome. The columella is oblique, covered with a moderate callosity, equipped with a tiny tubercle above under the outer lip, and is biplicate towards the middle, with rather thick folds. The outer lip is thickened on the last rib and arched; it is scarcely angular superiorly, acute at the aperture, smooth in the throat, and unidentate with a minute tubercle at the mouth of the sinus. The sinus is obliquely and roundly excavated in the outer lip below the suture.

== Distribution ==
This marine species occurs off Queensland, Australia and off the Loyalty Islands
