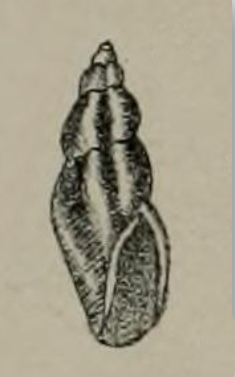
- Shell of Anacithara angulosa (holotype)

Scientific classification
- Kingdom: Animalia
- Phylum: Mollusca
- Class: Gastropoda
- Subclass: Caenogastropoda
- Order: Neogastropoda
- Superfamily: Conoidea
- Family: Horaiclavidae
- Genus: Anacithara
- Species: A. angulosa

Binomial name
- Anacithara angulosa (E. A. Smith, 1872)

Synonyms
- Mangelia angulosa E. A. Smith, 1872

= Anacithara angulosa =

Species of gastropod

Anacithara angulosa is a species of sea snail, a marine gastropod mollusk in the family Horaiclavidae.

== Description ==
The length of the shell attains 5 mm, its diameter 1¾ mm.

(Original description in Latin) The shell is small, ovate, and pale brown. It has 6 whorls; the first 4 are convex, polished, and simple. The remaining whorls are angled in the middle and are adorned with strong, curved, distant ribs (6 on the body whorl). They are very finely striated transversely; the striae are indistinct over the ribs. The aperture is subovate, almost equaling the spire. The columella is callous and tuberculate above. The outer lip is thickened, and the siphonal canal is very short.

== Distribution ==
This marine species occurs in the Atlantic Ocean off Western Africa
