= Anacithara simplex =

Scientific classification
- Kingdom: Animalia
- Phylum: Mollusca
- Class: Gastropoda
- Subclass: Caenogastropoda
- Order: Neogastropoda
- Superfamily: Conoidea
- Family: Horaiclavidae
- Genus: Anacithara
- Species: A. simplex

Binomial name
- Anacithara simplex (Turton W. H., 1932)

Synonyms
- Drillia simplex Turton W. H., 1932

Species of gastropod

Anacithara simplex is a species of sea snail, a marine gastropod mollusk in the family Horaiclavidae.

== Distribution ==
This marine species occurs off KwaZulu-Natal, South Africa
