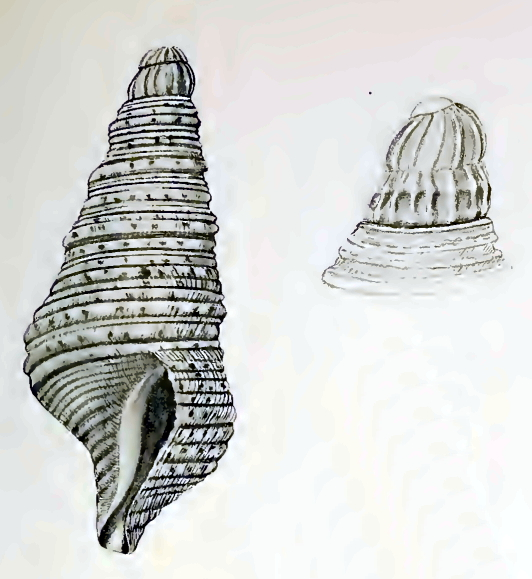
- Original image of a shell and its protoconch of Pseudexomilus costicapitata

Scientific classification
- Kingdom: Animalia
- Phylum: Mollusca
- Class: Gastropoda
- Subclass: Caenogastropoda
- Order: Neogastropoda
- Superfamily: Conoidea
- Family: Horaiclavidae
- Genus: Pseudexomilus
- Species: P. costicapitata

Binomial name
- Pseudexomilus costicapitata (Verco, 1909)

Synonyms
- Drillia costicapitata Verco, 1909

= Pseudexomilus costicapitata =

Species of gastropod

Pseudexomilus costicapitata is a species of sea snail, a marine gastropod mollusk in the family Horaiclavidae, the turrids.

== Description ==
The length of the shell attains 8 mm, its diameter 3.3 mm.

(Original description) The solid, high, narrow shell has a conical shape and is blunt at the apex, roundly much contracted at the base. The protoconch is mamillate and consists of 2¼ whorls. The shell contains eighteen round axial ribs. The suture is linear, quite inconspicuous. The 5 whorls of the spire are straight, sloping, with two carinae, slightly nodulated, equidistant from each other and the sutures, the lower much the larger and rounder. Other spirals arise, so that in the penultimate whorl there are two above each carina and two below the lower. In the body whorl there are twelve below it; they are steep behind and sloping in front. Very fine sinuous growth striae cross them. The aperture is roundly rhomboidal. The siphonal canal is short and open, slightly bent to the left. The outer lip is thin, simple, crenulated outside by the spirals. The colour is dull creamy-white, with irregular faint-brown narrow axial flames, with a tendency to follow the curve of growth lines. The larger carinae are more or less regularly articulated with brown.

== Distribution ==
This marine species is endemic to Australia and occurs off South Australia.
