= Striatoguraleus himaeformis =

Scientific classification
- Kingdom: Animalia
- Phylum: Mollusca
- Class: Gastropoda
- Subclass: Caenogastropoda
- Order: Neogastropoda
- Family: Horaiclavidae
- Genus: Striatoguraleus
- Species: S. himaeformis

Binomial name
- Striatoguraleus himaeformis Kilburn, 1994

Species of gastropod

Striatoguraleus himaeformis is a species of sea snail, a marine gastropod mollusk in the family Horaiclavidae. The length of the nassariiform shell attains 6.2 mm. This marine species occurs off KwaZulu-Natal to Cape Province, South Africa
