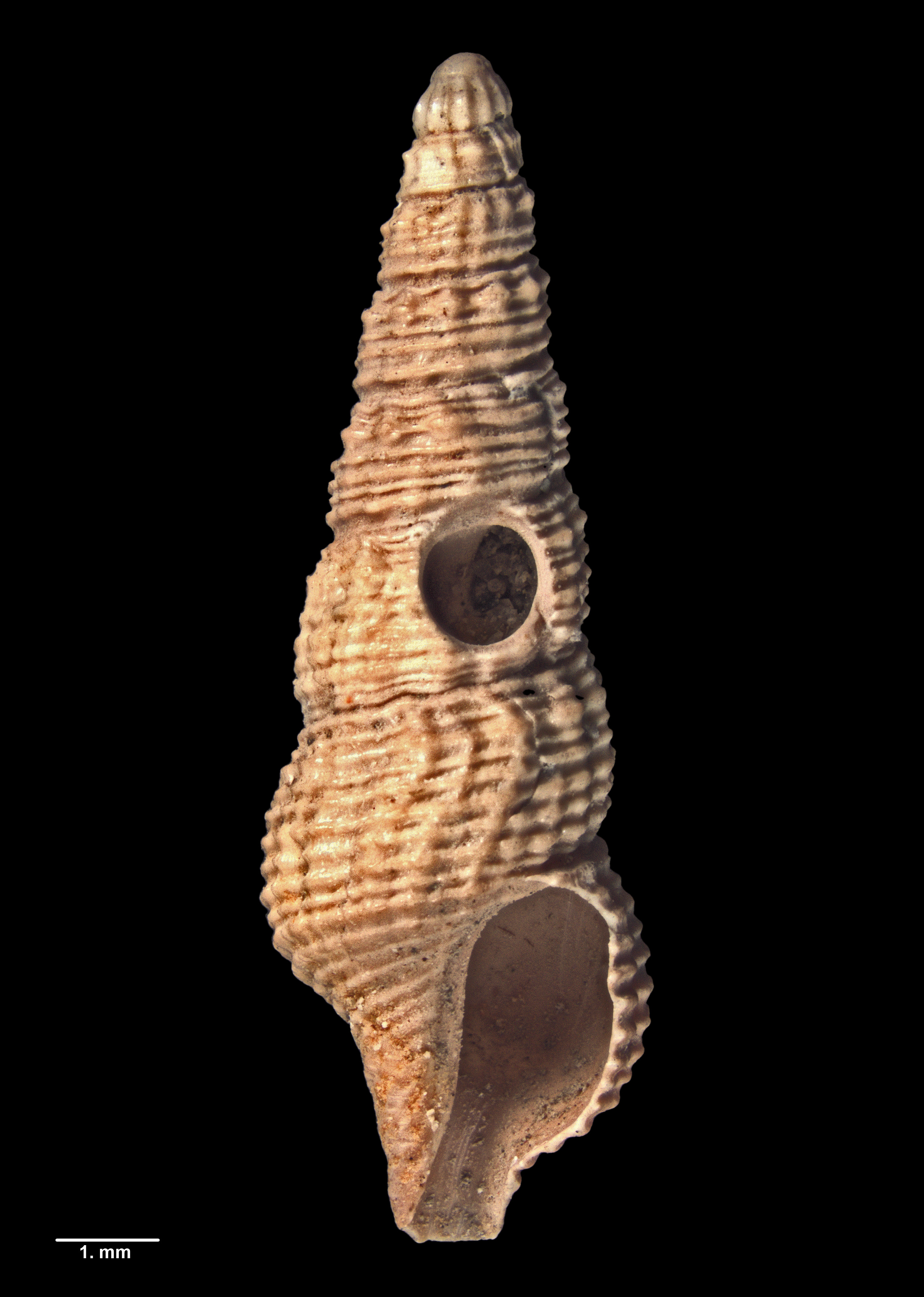
- Holotype of Pseudexomilus caelatus from Auckland War Memorial Museum

Scientific classification
- Kingdom: Animalia
- Phylum: Mollusca
- Class: Gastropoda
- Subclass: Caenogastropoda
- Order: Neogastropoda
- Family: Horaiclavidae
- Genus: Pseudexomilus
- Species: P. caelatus

Binomial name
- Pseudexomilus caelatus A.W.B. Powell, 1944

= Pseudexomilus caelatus =

Extinct species of gastropod

Pseudexomilus caelatus is an extinct species of marine gastropod mollusc in the family Horaiclavidae. Fossils of the species date to the middle Miocene, and are found in the St Vincent Basin of South Australia.

== Description ==
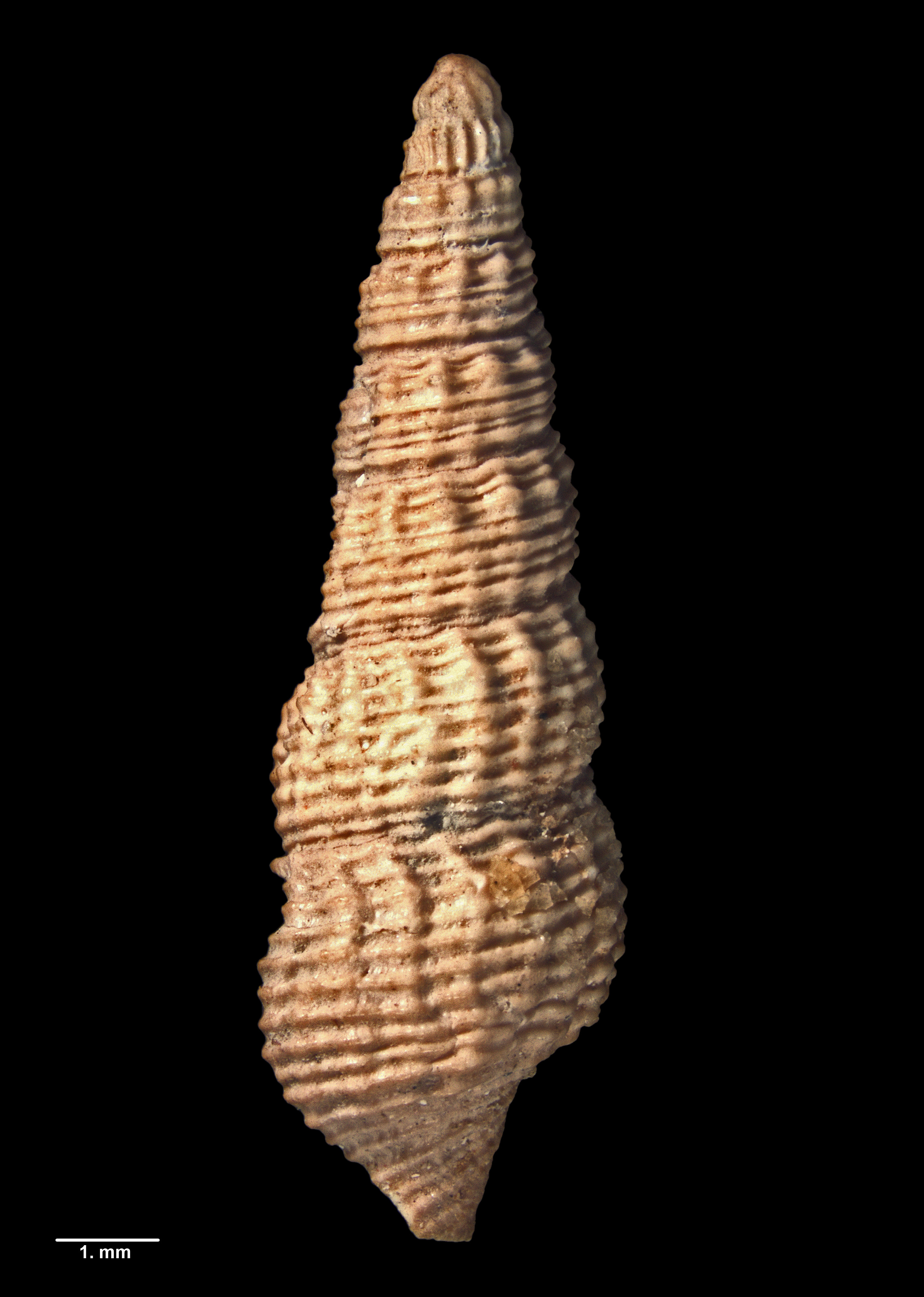
View of reverse side of holotype

In the original description, Powell described the species' as follows:

Protoconch of 2½ whorls, tip bluntly rounded, smooth, following whorls much larger, strongly convex, radially ribbed, 13 radials per whorl. Post-nuclear whorls with strong, flat-topped, sharply raised wavy cords, four on first whorl, six on fourth whorl, nine on penultimate and twenty-two on body-whorl, nine of which are on the anterior end. Axials obsolescent, irregularly but weakly developed throughout, about ten per whorl. Aperture (better shown in paratype) quadrangular. Outer lip not thickened, but lirate within. Anterior canal short, subtubular, not sinused. Anal sinus as described above.

The holotype of the species measures 11.6 mm (0.46 in) in height and 3.9 mm (0.15 in) in diameter.

== Taxonomy ==
P. caelatus was first described by A.W.B. Powell in 1944, who named it the type species of the genus Pseudexomilus. The holotype was collected by W. Howchin and J. C. Verco in 1919 from the Metropolitan Abattoirs Bore in Adelaide, Australia, and is held by the Auckland War Memorial Museum.

== Distribution ==
This extinct marine species occurs in middle Miocene (Bairnsdalian) strata of the lower Dry Creek Sand, of the St Vincent Basin at a depth of between 122–152 m (400–499 ft), in Adelaide, South Australia.
