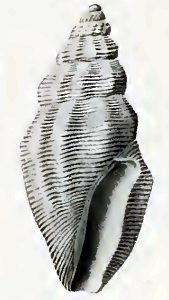
- Original image of a shell of Anacithara exquisita

Scientific classification
- Kingdom: Animalia
- Phylum: Mollusca
- Class: Gastropoda
- Subclass: Caenogastropoda
- Order: Neogastropoda
- Superfamily: Conoidea
- Family: Horaiclavidae
- Genus: Anacithara
- Species: A. exquisita

Binomial name
- Anacithara exquisita Hedley, 1922

= Anacithara exquisita =

Species of gastropod

Anacithara exquisita is a species of sea snail, a marine gastropod mollusk in the family Horaiclavidae.

== Description ==
The length of the shell attains 4.5 mm, its diameter 2 mm.

(Original description) The small shell has a biconical shape. Its colour is uniform pure white. It contains six, turreted whorls. The protoconch consists of two smooth, elevated, symmetrical whorls. The ribs are rather low and rounded, discontinuous from whorl to whorl. They number eight on the penultimate whorl, which become shorter, lower, wider spaced, and tend to disappear. Fine, dense, even spiral threads overrun the whole surface. The open aperture is unarmed. The varix is well developed. The sinus is a semicircular incision. The siphonal canal is open and short.

== Distribution ==
This marine species is endemic to Australia and occurs off Queensland.
