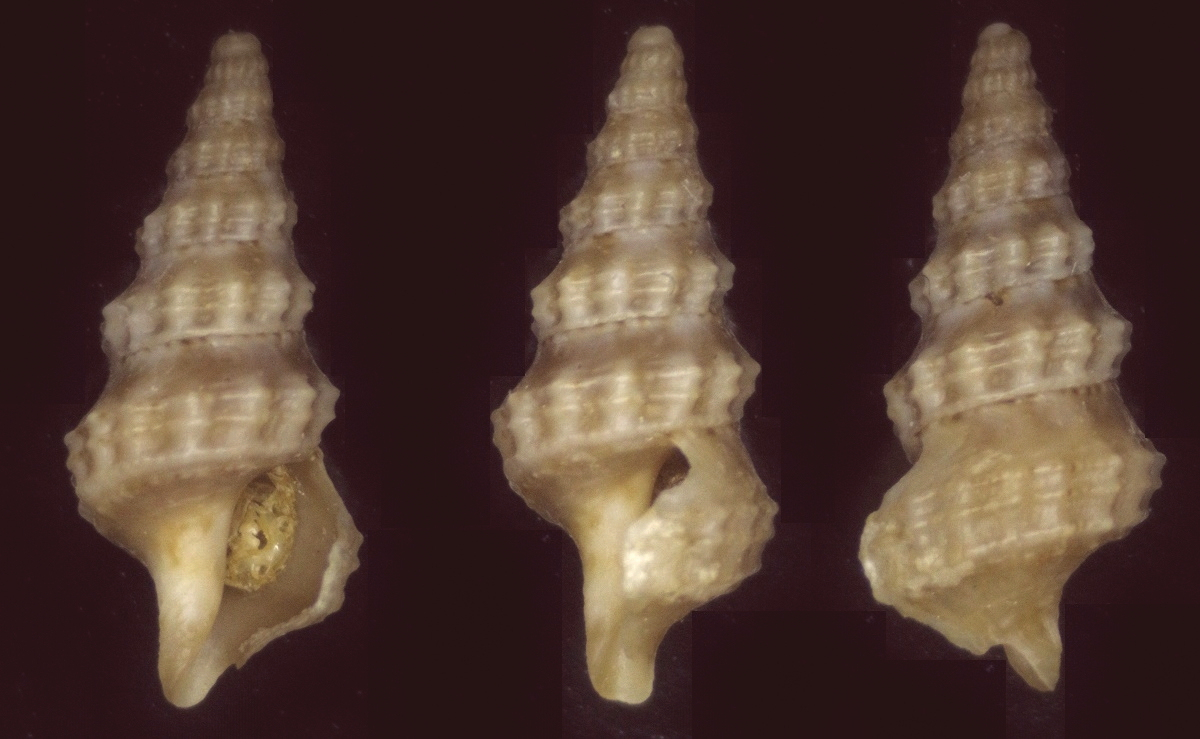
- Three views of a shell of Pseudexomilus fenestratus

Scientific classification
- Kingdom: Animalia
- Phylum: Mollusca
- Class: Gastropoda
- Subclass: Caenogastropoda
- Order: Neogastropoda
- Superfamily: Conoidea
- Family: Horaiclavidae
- Genus: Pseudexomilus
- Species: P. fenestratus

Binomial name
- Pseudexomilus fenestratus R.N. Kilburn, 1988

= Pseudexomilus fenestratus =

Species of gastropod

Pseudexomilus fenestratus is a species of sea snail, a marine gastropod mollusk in the family Horaiclavidae, the turrids.

== Description ==
The length of the shell attains 13.8 mm, its diameter is 5.4 mm.

== Distribution ==
This marine species occurs off KwaZulu-Natal, South Africa.
