= Anguloclavus =

Scientific classification
- Kingdom: Animalia
- Phylum: Mollusca
- Class: Gastropoda
- Subclass: Caenogastropoda
- Order: Neogastropoda
- Superfamily: Conoidea
- Family: Horaiclavidae
- Genus: Anguloclavus; Shuto, 1983

Type species
- Mangilia multicostata Schepman, 1913 accepted as Horaiclavus multicostatus (Schepman, 1913)

Species
- See text

Synonyms
- Horaiclavus (Anguloclavus) Shuto, 1983 (original rank)

Genus of gastropods

Anguloclavus is a genus of sea snails, marine gastropod mollusks in the family Horaiclavidae.

Shuto (1983) created Anguloclavus as a subgenus of Horaiclavus for the species Horaiclavus (Anguloclavus) multicostatus (Schepman, 1913). Anguloclavus nevertheless has remained a taxon inquirendum.

== Species ==
- Anguloclavus multicostatus (Schepman, 1913)
