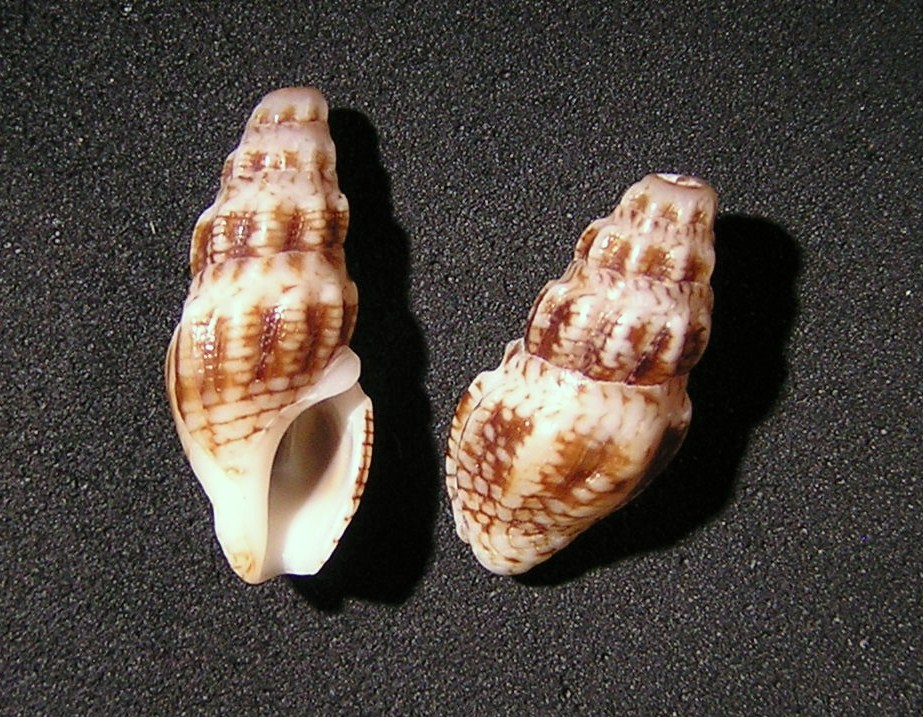
- Two views of a shell of Nquma rousi

Scientific classification
- Kingdom: Animalia
- Phylum: Mollusca
- Class: Gastropoda
- Subclass: Caenogastropoda
- Order: Neogastropoda
- Superfamily: Conoidea
- Family: Horaiclavidae
- Genus: Nquma; Kilburn, 1988

Type species
- Pleurotoma rousi Sowerby III, 1886

Species
- See text

= Nquma =

Genus of gastropods

Nquma is a genus of sea snails, marine gastropod mollusks in the family Horaiclavidae.

== Species ==
Species within the genus Nquma include:

- Nquma rousi (Sowerby III, 1886)
- Nquma scalpta Kilburn, 1988
