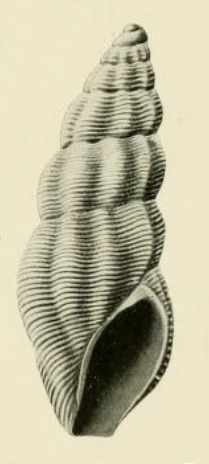
- Shell of Anacithara naufraga (holotype)

Scientific classification
- Kingdom: Animalia
- Phylum: Mollusca
- Class: Gastropoda
- Subclass: Caenogastropoda
- Order: Neogastropoda
- Superfamily: Conoidea
- Family: Horaiclavidae
- Genus: Anacithara
- Species: A. naufraga

Binomial name
- Anacithara naufraga (Hedley, 1909)

Synonyms
- Mangelia naufraga Hedley, 1909

= Anacithara naufraga =

Species of gastropod

Anacithara naufraga is a species of sea snail, a marine gastropod mollusc in the family Horaiclavidae.

== Description ==
The length of the shell attains 6 mm, its diameter 2.3 mm.

(Original description) The solid, cream-colored shell is narrowly fusiform. It contains seven whorls, including a small, smooth, two-whorled protoconch. The sculpture shows about eight prominent curved ribs that undulate the suture, and extend to the base. These are divided by broad and gently sloping interstices. Across both ribs and furrows run fine, close, spiral threads, amounting to 32 to 36 on the body whorl, and about onehalf that number on the penultimate whorl. Between the threads are microscopic radial bars. The aperture is oval, the anterior notch not apparent. The outer lip is protected by a strong rib-varix. The siphonal canal is short.

== Distribution ==
This marine species is endemic to Australia and occurs off Queensland.
