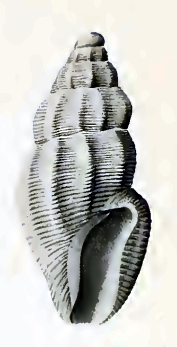
- Apertural view of a shell of Anacithara brevicostata

Scientific classification
- Kingdom: Animalia
- Phylum: Mollusca
- Class: Gastropoda
- Subclass: Caenogastropoda
- Order: Neogastropoda
- Superfamily: Conoidea
- Family: Horaiclavidae
- Genus: Anacithara; Hedley, 1922

Type species
- Mangelia naufraga Hedley, 1909

Species
- See text

Synonyms
- Mangelia (Anacithara) Hedley, 1922

= Anacithara =

Genus of gastropods

Anacithara is a genus of sea snails, marine gastropod mollusks in the family Horaiclavidae.

This genus was previously classified under the subfamily Mangeliinae, but transferred to Crassispirinae by Kilburn in 1994 In 2011 it was brought into the family Horaiclavidae by Bouchet P., Kantor Yu.I., Sysoev A. & Puillandre N. in their publication "A new operational classification of the Conoidea"

== Description ==
This genus consists of small claviform shells (3–10 mm) which resemble Eucithara Fischer, 1883 (family Mangeliidae) in their upper whorls and sculpture, but differ in their wide aperture, devoid of teeth on either side. The small, smooth and blunt protoconch consists of two whorls.

== Species ==
Species in Anacithara include:

- † Anacithara akisi Kolokotronis, 2021
- Anacithara anae Horro, Gori, Rosado & Rolán, 2021
- Anacithara angulicostata Kilburn, 1994
- Anacithara angulosa (E. A. Smith, 1872)
- † Anacithara axialis (P. Marshall, 1918)
- Anacithara biconica Barros, Santana & Lima, 2015
- Anacithara biscoitoi Nolf & Swinnen, 2011
- Anacithara brevicostata Hedley, 1922
- † Anacithara bulbosa Shuto, 1961
- Anacithara caelatura Hedley, 1922
- † Anacithara clifdenica Powell, 1942
- Anacithara conata (Hedley, 1909)
- Anacithara dulcinea (Melvill & Standen, 1895)
- † Anacithara errabunda Powell, 1942
- Anacithara exquisita Hedley, 1922
- † Anacithara finlayi Powell, 1942
- Anacithara fortilabiata Horro, Gori, Rosado & Rolán, 2021
- Anacithara goodingii (E. A. Smith, 1884)
- Anacithara hebes Hedley, 1922
- Anacithara ione (Melvill & Standen, 1896)
- † Anacithara janjukiensis Powell, 1944
- Anacithara leptalea Hedley, 1922
- Anacithara levukensis (Watson, 1881)
- Anacithara maltzani (Knudsen, 1952)
- † Anacithara mantjeuriensis (Oostingh, 1938)
- Anacithara minutistriata (E. A. Smith, 1882)
- Anacithara modica (E. A. Smith, 1882)
- † Anacithara nana Powell, 1942
- Anacithara nanisca (Hervier, 1897)
- Anacithara naufraga (Hedley, 1909)
- Anacithara osumiensis (G. B. Sowerby III, 1913)
- Anacithara perfecta Kay, 1979
- Anacithara phyllidis (Hedley, 1922)
- Anacithara platycheila (E. A. Smith, 1882)
- Anacithara propinqua Hedley, 1922
- † Anacithara pseudodanjouxi (Brébion, 1992)
- Anacithara pseudorissoina Horro, Gori, Rosado & Rolán, 2021
- Anacithara punctostriata Bozzetti, 2009
- Anacithara pupiformis Barros, Santana & Lima, 2015
- Anacithara pyrgoformis Barros, Santana & Lima, 2015
- Anacithara querna (Melvill, 1910)
- Anacithara rissoina Hedley, 1922
- Anacithara robusta Hedley, 1922
- Anacithara simplex (Turton W. H., 1932)
- Anacithara striata Ardovini, 2021
- Anacithara stricta Hedley, 1922
- Anacithara subrissoina Kilburn, 1994
- Anacithara themeropis (Melvill & Standen, 1896)
- Anacithara tumida Hedley, 1922
- Anacithara undaticosta (Reeve, 1845)

Species brought into synonymy

- Anacithara alfredi (E. A. Smith, 1904): synonym of Pseudorhaphitoma alfredi (E. A. Smith, 1904)
- Anacithara amplexa (Gould, 1860): synonym of Guraleus amplexus (Gould, 1860)
- Anacithara hervieri Hedley, 1922: synonym of Pseudorhaphitoma hervieri (Hedley, 1922) (unaccepted > superseded combination)
- Anacithara lita (Melvill & Standen, 1896): synonym of Asperosculptura lita (Melvill & Standen, 1896)
- Anacithara pupiforme Barros, Santana & Lima, 2015: synonym of Anacithara pupiformis Barros, Santana & Lima, 2015
- Anacithara pyrgoforme Barros, Santana & Lima, 2015: synonym of Anacithara pyrgoformis Barros, Santana & Lima, 2015
