= Striatoguraleus =

Scientific classification
- Kingdom: Animalia
- Phylum: Mollusca
- Class: Gastropoda
- Subclass: Caenogastropoda
- Order: Neogastropoda
- Superfamily: Conoidea
- Family: Horaiclavidae
- Genus: Striatoguraleus; R.N. Kilburn, 1994

Type species
- Drillia thetis E. A. Smith, 1904

Species
- See text

Genus of gastropods

Striatoguraleus is a genus of sea snails, marine gastropod mollusks in the family Horaiclavidae.

== Distribution ==
Species in this marine genus occur off South Africa.

== Species ==
Species within the genus Striatoguraleus include:

- Striatoguraleus electrinus Kilburn, 1994
- Striatoguraleus himaeformis Kilburn, 1994
- Striatoguraleus laticulmen Kilburn, 1994
- Striatoguraleus thetis (Smith E. A., 1904)
- Striatoguraleus vellicatus Kilburn, 1994
