= Naskia =

Scientific classification
- Kingdom: Animalia
- Phylum: Mollusca
- Class: Gastropoda
- Subclass: Caenogastropoda
- Order: Neogastropoda
- Superfamily: Conoidea
- Family: Horaiclavidae
- Genus: Naskia; Sysoev & Ivanov, 1985

Type species
- Naskia axiplicata Sysoev & Ivanov, 1985

Species
- See text

Genus of gastropods

Naskia is a genus of sea snails, marine gastropod mollusks in the family Horaiclavidae.

== Species ==
Species within the genus Naskia include:

- Naskia axiplicata Sysoev & Ivanov, 1985
