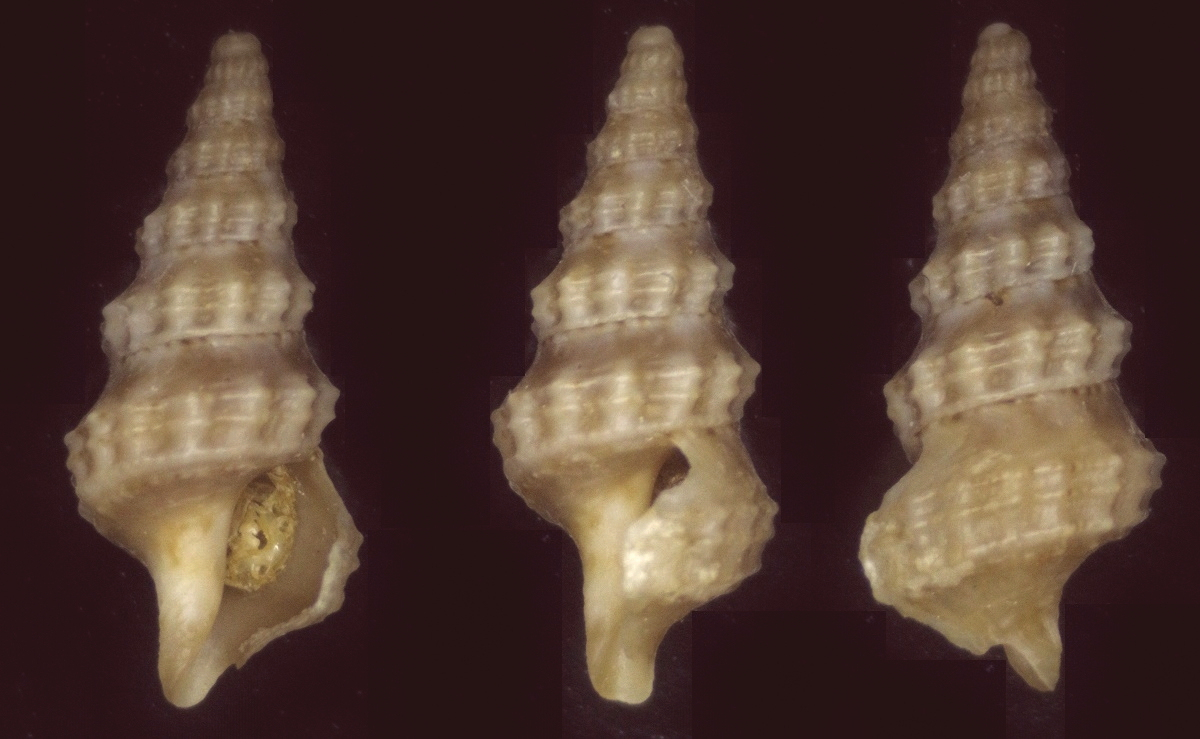
- Pseudexomilus fenestratus

Scientific classification
- Kingdom: Animalia
- Phylum: Mollusca
- Class: Gastropoda
- Subclass: Caenogastropoda
- Order: Neogastropoda
- Family: Horaiclavidae
- Genus: Pseudexomilus; Powell, 1944

Type species
- † Pseudexomilus caelatus Powell, 1944

= Pseudexomilus =

Pseudexomilus Temporal range: Pliocene–Present

Genus of gastropods

Pseudexomilus is a genus of sea snails, marine gastropod mollusks in the family Horaiclavidae. Members are found on the coasts of Australia and in the Indian Ocean.

== Description ==
In the original description, Ponder described Pseudexomilus as follows:

It has a 2½-whorled blunt protoconch, tip smooth, remaining two whorls radially costate. The shell is tall-spired, Terebra-like, sculptured with wavy spiral cords crossed by obsolescent axials. The sinus is Daphnellid, descending obliquely and recurrently from the suture, more or less straight, but narrowly rounded at the apex before descending obliquely forward below the weakly defined shoulder.

The genus has a moderately small shell measuring between 8–12 mm (0.31–0.47 in), is claviform with a tall spire and small ovate-quadrate aperture. Pseudexomilus can be distinguished due to having a strongly contracted base, and a large and blunt apex.

== Taxonomy ==
The genus was first described by Baden Powell in 1944, who named Pseudexomilus caelatus as the type species. It was placed as a likely member of the family Horaiclavidae in 2011.

== Distribution ==
Members of Pseudexomilus are found in the waters of Australia, Southern Africa and Oman. Fossils of the species date to the lower mid Pliocene, and are found in South Australia.

== Species ==
Species within the genus Pseudexomilus include:

- Pseudexomilus bicarinatus Shuto, 1983
- † Pseudexomilus caelatus Powell, 1944
- Pseudexomilus costicapitata (Verco, 1909)
- Pseudexomilus fenestratus Kilburn, 1988
- Pseudexomilus fuscoapicatus Morassi, 1997
- Pseudexomilus fuscobandatus Horro, Gori, Rosado & Rolán, 2021
- Pseudexomilus protemporalis Horro, Gori, Rosado & Rolán, 2021
- Pseudexomilus robini Horro, Gori & Renda, 2025

== Gallery ==
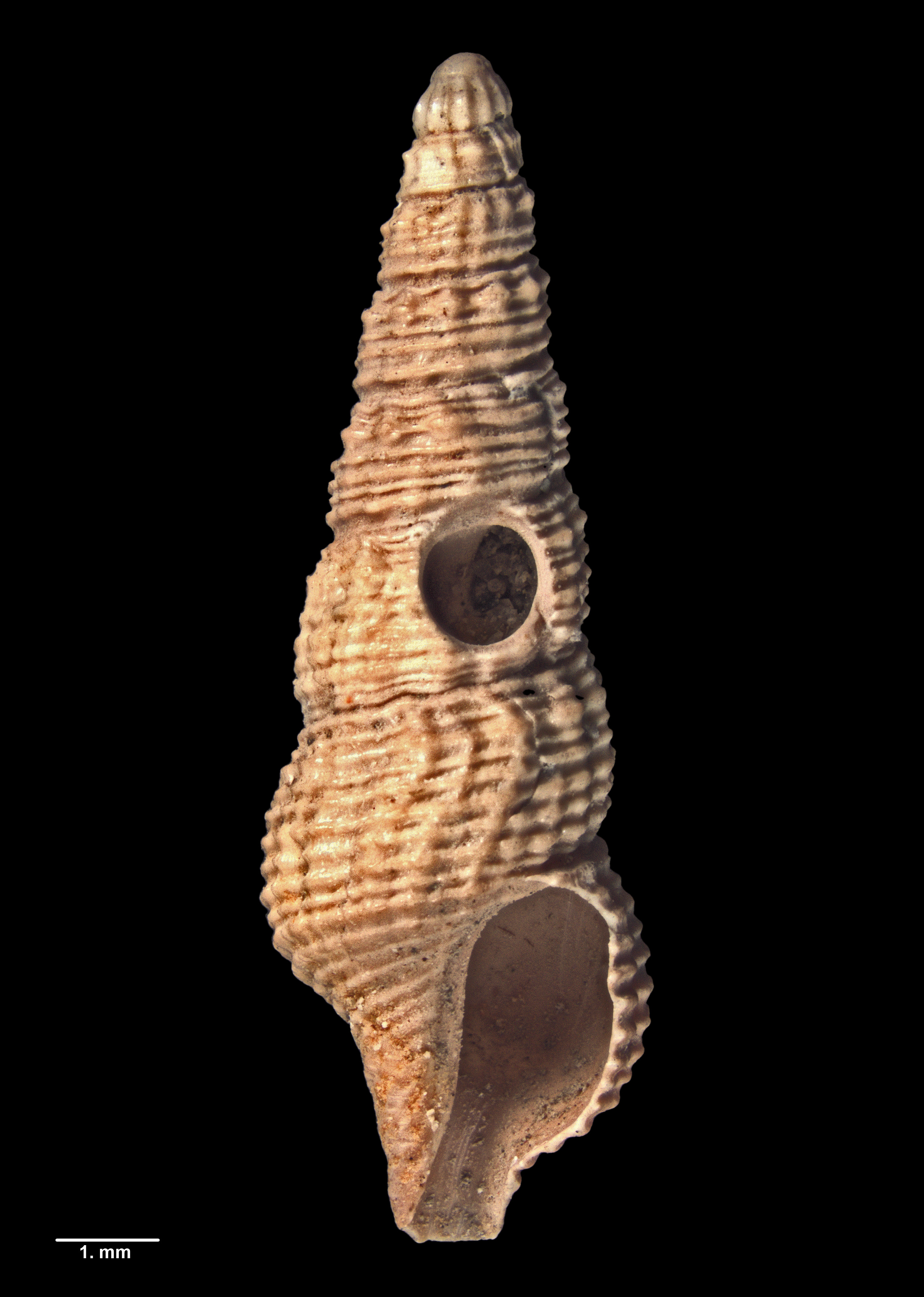
Pseudexomilus caelatus

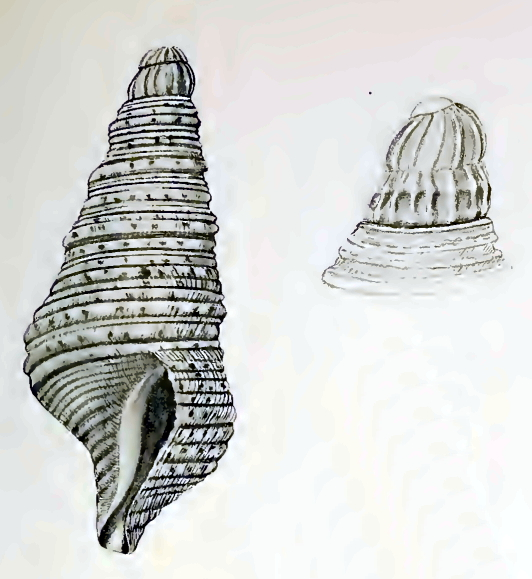
Pseudexomilus costicapitata

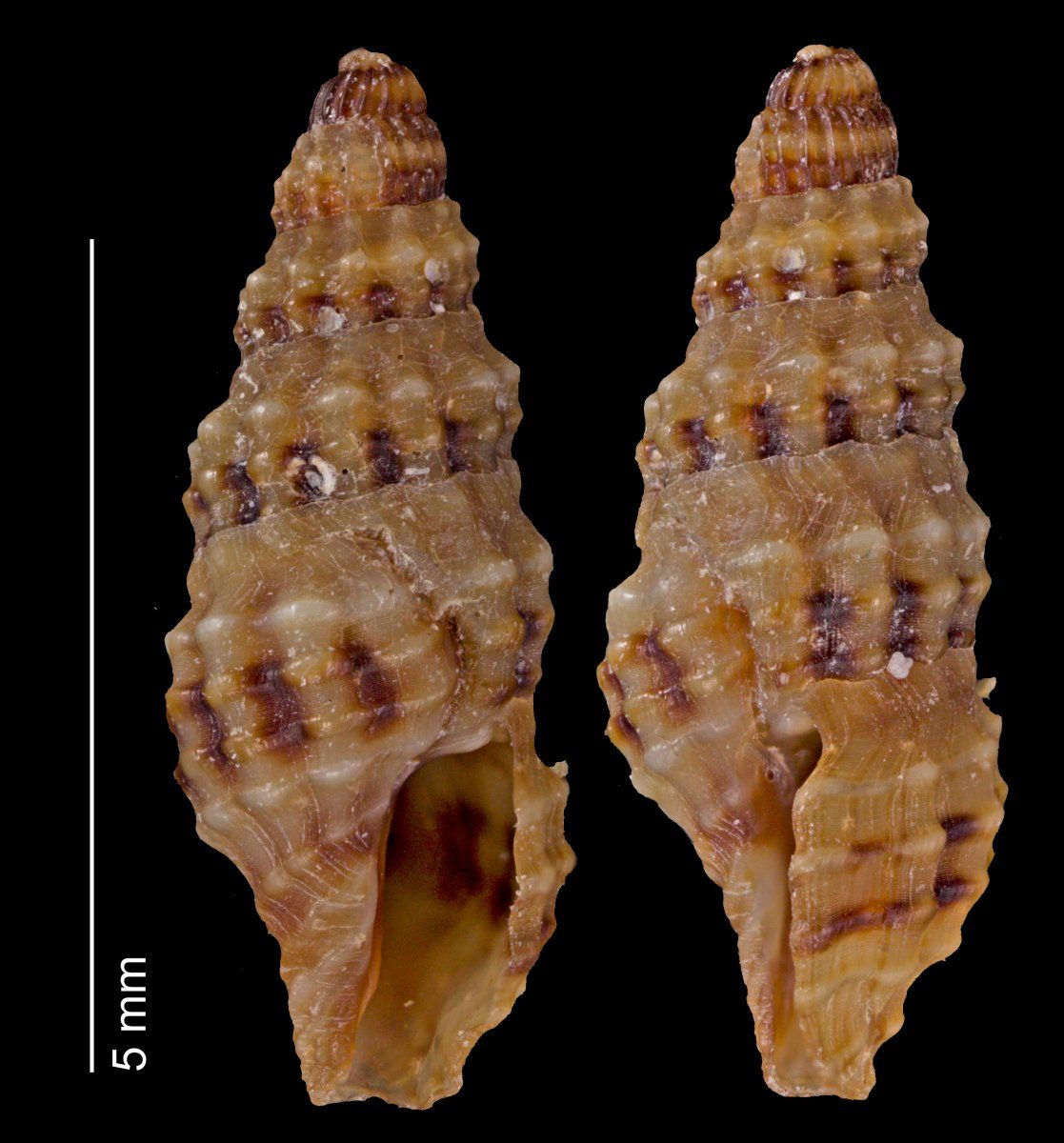
Pseudexomilus fuscobandatus

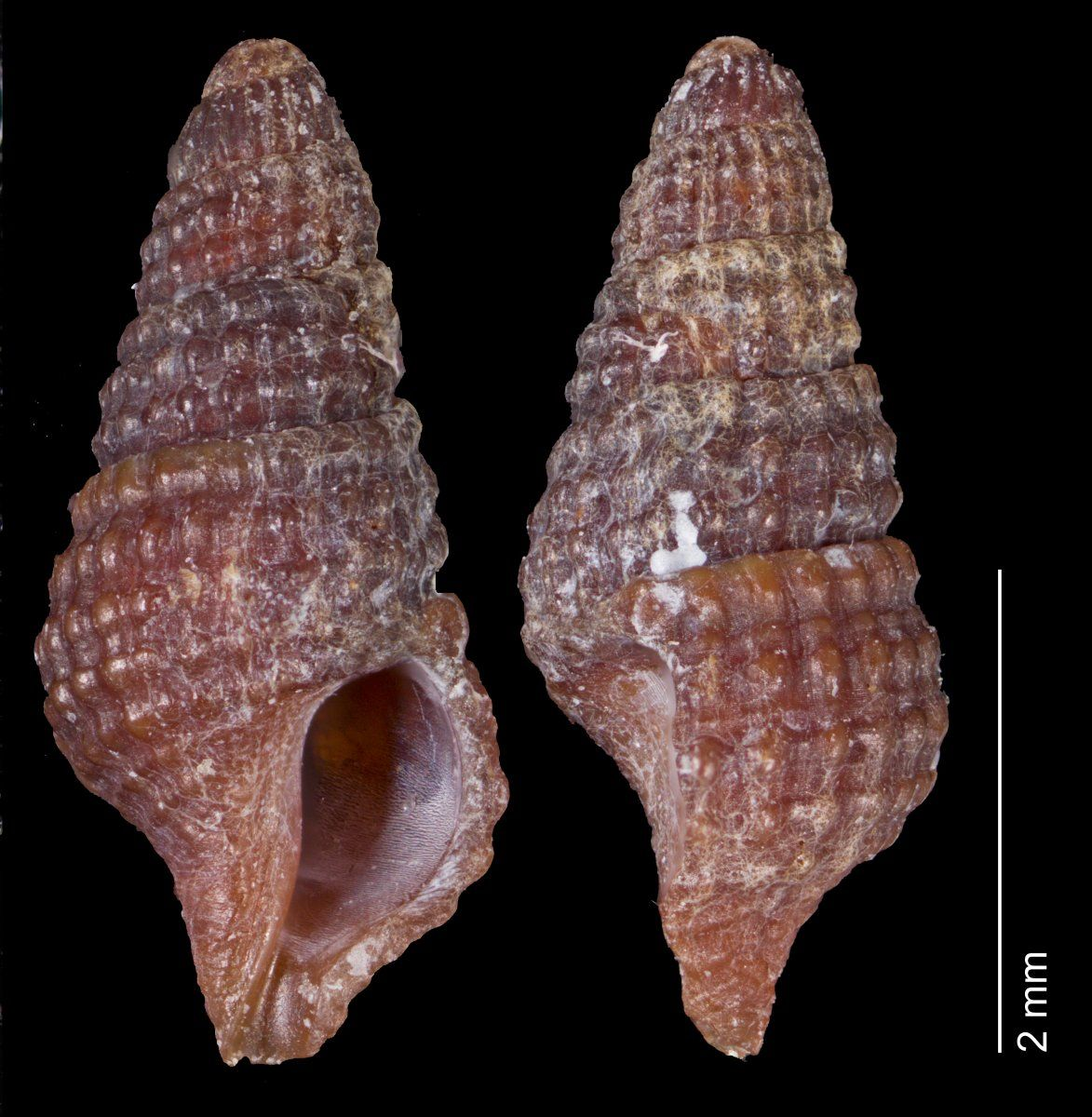
Pseudexomilus protemporalis
