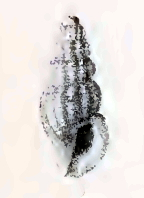
- Original image of a shell of Asperosculptura lita

Scientific classification
- Kingdom: Animalia
- Phylum: Mollusca
- Class: Gastropoda
- Subclass: Caenogastropoda
- Order: Neogastropoda
- Superfamily: Conoidea
- Family: Horaiclavidae
- Genus: Asperosculptura
- Species: A. lita

Binomial name
- Asperosculptura lita (Melvill & Standen, 1896)

Synonyms
- Anacithara lita (Melvill & Standen, 1896); Clathurella lita Melvill & Standen, 1896 (original combination)

= Asperosculptura lita =

Species of gastropod

Asperosculptura lita is a species of sea snail, a marine gastropod mollusk in the family Horaiclavidae.

== Description ==
(Original description) The length of the shell attains 4 mm, its diameter 1.5 mm. This is a small plain shell of simple character. The whorls are six; the lower ones ventricose, the two apical swollen, smooth and shining. Obtuse and thick ribs, longitudinally, ornament the shell, and these are spirally crossed by many conspicuous lirae. The aperture is widely ovate. The outer lip is slightly thickened. The shell is whitish. The aperture is brown within. The columellar margin is plain. Likewise the sinus on the outer lip is inconspicuous, small and rounded.

== Distribution ==
This marine species occurs off the Loyalty Islands and Vanuatu.
