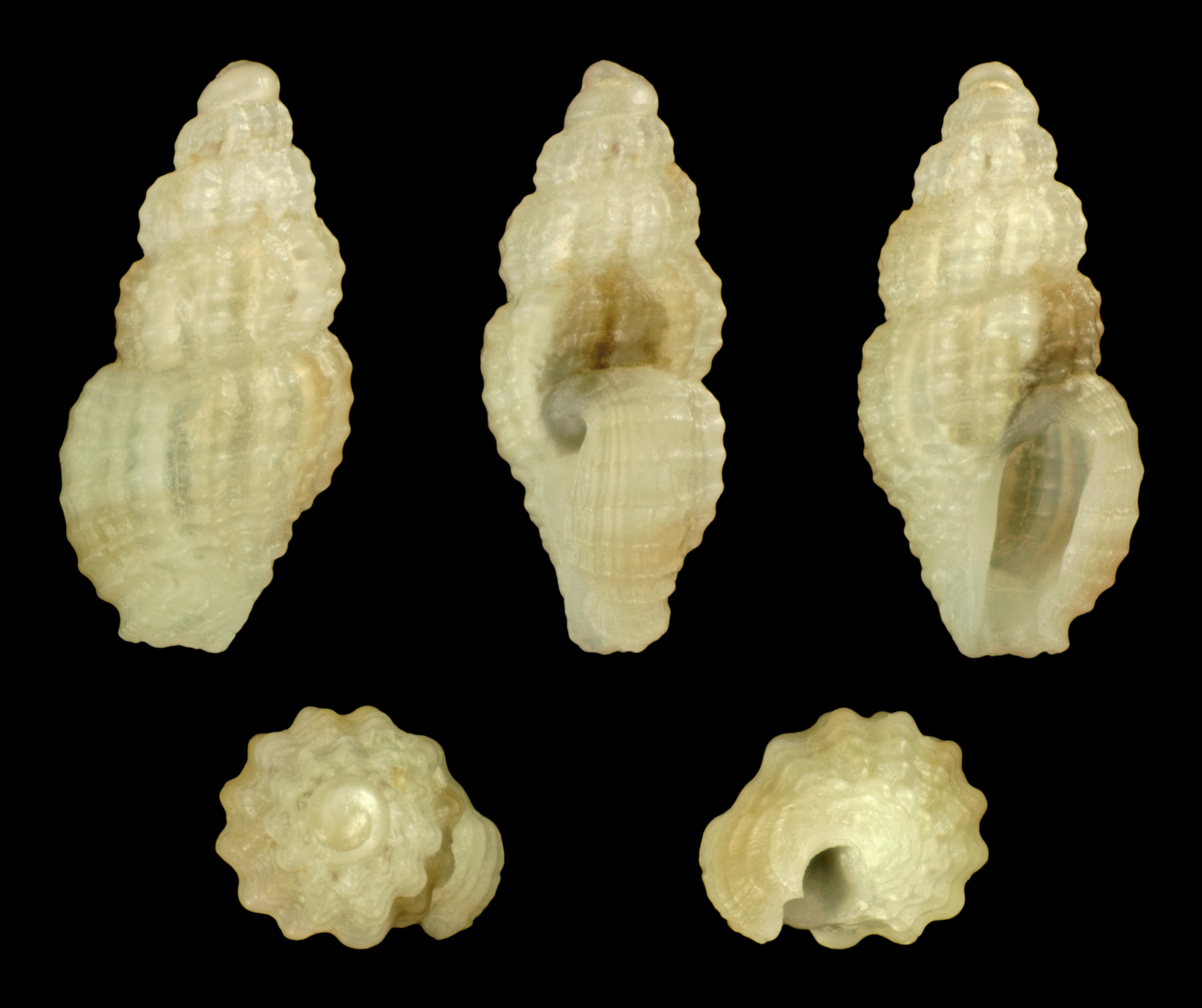
- Shell of Asperosculptura exquisita

Scientific classification
- Kingdom: Animalia
- Phylum: Mollusca
- Class: Gastropoda
- Subclass: Caenogastropoda
- Order: Neogastropoda
- Superfamily: Conoidea
- Family: Horaiclavidae
- Genus: Asperosculptura; Ardovini, Poppe & Tagaro, 2021

Type species
- Asperosculptura aikeni Ardovini, Poppe & Tagaro, 2021

Species
- See text

= Asperosculptura =

Genus of gastropods

Asperosculptura is a genus of sea snails, marine gastropod mollusks in the family Horaiclavidae.

== Species ==
- Asperosculptura aikeni Ardovini, Poppe & Tagaro, 2021
- Asperosculptura exquisita Ardovini, Poppe & Tagaro, 2021
- Asperosculptura lita (Melvill & Standen, 1896)
- Asperosculptura monteiroi Ardovini, Poppe & Tagaro, 2021
