= Austrocarina =

Scientific classification
- Kingdom: Animalia
- Phylum: Mollusca
- Class: Gastropoda
- Subclass: Caenogastropoda
- Order: Neogastropoda
- Superfamily: Conoidea
- Family: Horaiclavidae
- Genus: Austrocarina; Laseron, 1954

Type species
- Leucosyrinx recta Hedley, 1903

Species
- See text

Genus of gastropods

Austrocarina is a genus of small predatory sea snails, marine gastropod mollusks in the family Horaiclavidae.

It was formerly included within the family Pseudomelatomidae.

== Species ==
Species within the genus Austrocarina include:

- Austrocarina recta (Hedley, 1903)
