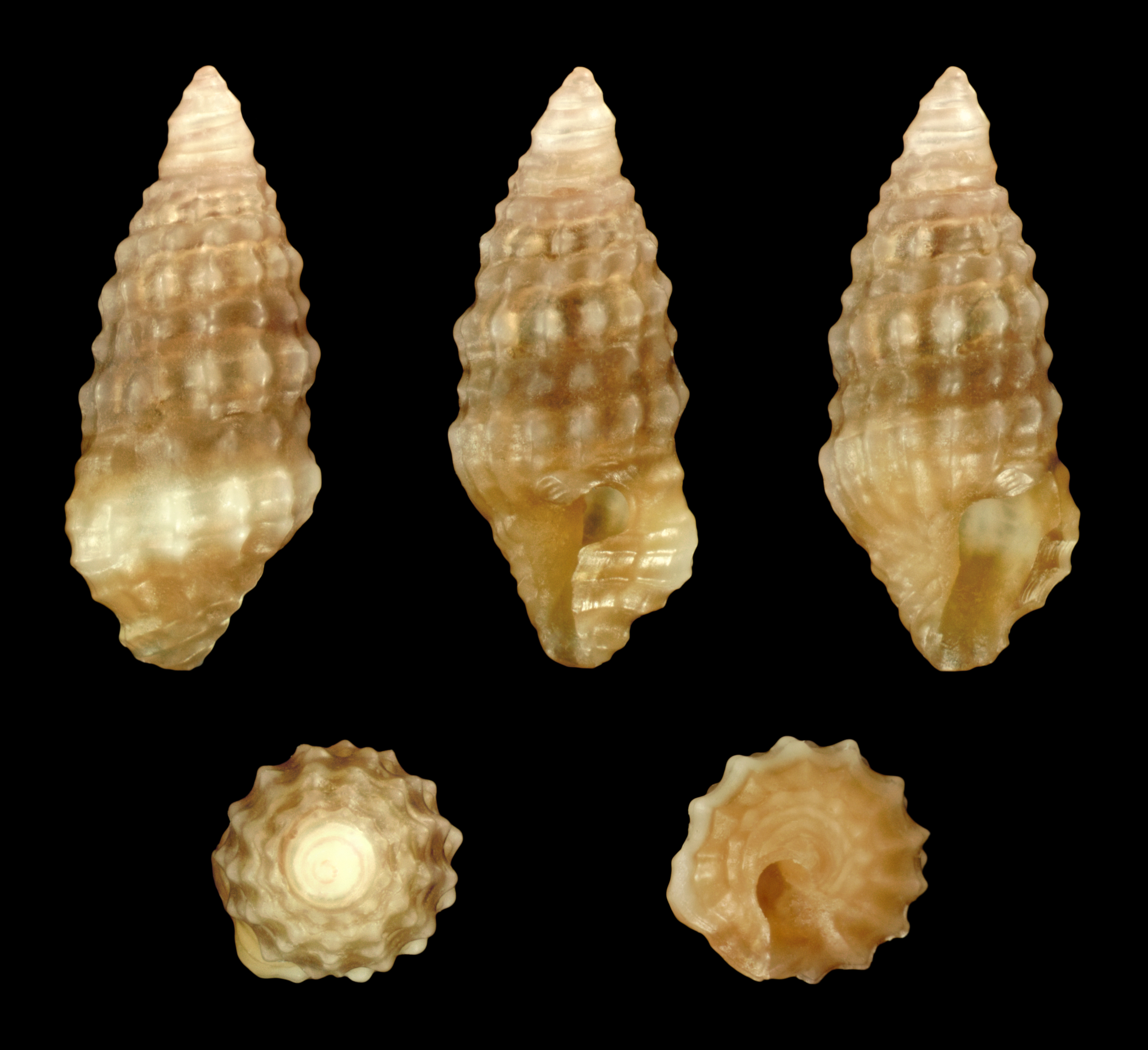
- Carinapex minutissima shell

Scientific classification
- Kingdom: Animalia
- Phylum: Mollusca
- Class: Gastropoda
- Subclass: Caenogastropoda
- Order: Neogastropoda
- Superfamily: Conoidea
- Family: Horaiclavidae; Bouchet, Kantor, Sysoev & Puillandre, 2011

Genera
- See text

= Horaiclavidae =

Family of gastropods

Horaiclavidae is a family of predatory sea snails, marine gastropod mollusks in the superfamily Conoidea.

In 2011 this family was split off from the family Pseudomelatomidae (formerly the subfamily Crassispirinae McLean, 1971) by Bouchet P., Kantor Yu.I., Sysoev A. & Puillandre N. in their publication "A new operational classification of the Conoidea". It forms a clade together with the family Clavatulidae. It has many characters in common with the family Pseudomelatomidae, except the smaller shell with a low spire, the short siphonal canal and a weak or absent spiral sculpture. The radular formula is 1-0-0-0-1, but some species in this family lack a radula.

== Genera ==
Genera within the family Horaiclavidae include:

- Anacithara Hedley, 1922
- Anguloclavus Shuto, 1983 (taxon inquirendum)
- Aoteadrillia Powell, 1942
- Asperosculptura Ardovini, Poppe & Tagaro, 2021
- † Atoma Bellardi, 1875
- Austrocarina Laseron, 1954
- Austrodrillia Hedley, 1918
- † Boreodrillia Sorgenfrei, 1958
- Buchema Corea, 1934
- Carinapex Dall, 1924
- Ceritoturris Dall, 1924
- Darrylia García, 2008
- Epideira Hedley, 1918
- Graciliclava Shuto, 1983
- Haedropleura Bucquoy, Dautzenberg & Dollfus, 1883
- Horaiclavus Oyama, 1954 - type genus
- Inodrillia Bartsch, 1943 - synonyms: Inodrillara Bartsch, 1943; Inodrillina Bartsch, 1943
- Inkinga Kilburn, 1988
- Iwaoa Kuroda, 1940
- Marshallena Allan, 1927 - synonym: Sugitanitoma Kuroda, 1959
- Mauidrillia Powell, 1942
- Micropleurotoma Thiele, 1929
- Naskia Sysoev & Ivanov, 1985
- Nquma Kilburn, 1988
- Paradrillia Makiyama, 1940 - synonyms: Vexitomina Powell, 1942; Alticlavatula MacNeil, 1960
- Pseudexomilus Powell, 1944
- Psittacodrillia Kilburn, 1988
- Striatoguraleus Kilburn, 1994
- Vexitomina Powell, 1942

Genera brought into synonymy

- Alticlavatula MacNeil, 1961: synonym of Paradrillia Makiyama, 1940
- Coronacomitas Shuto, 1983: synonym of Paradrillia Makiyama, 1940
- Cytharoclavus Kuroda & Oyama in Kuroda, Habe & Oyama, 1971: synonym of Horaiclavus Oyama, 1954
- Inodrillara Bartsch, 1943: synonym of Inodrillia Bartsch, 1943
- Inodrillina Bartsch, 1943: synonym of Inodrillia Bartsch, 1943
- Regidrillia Powell, 1942: synonym of Austrodrillia Hedley, 1918
- Sugitanitoma Kuroda, 1959: synonym of Marshallena Finlay, 1926
