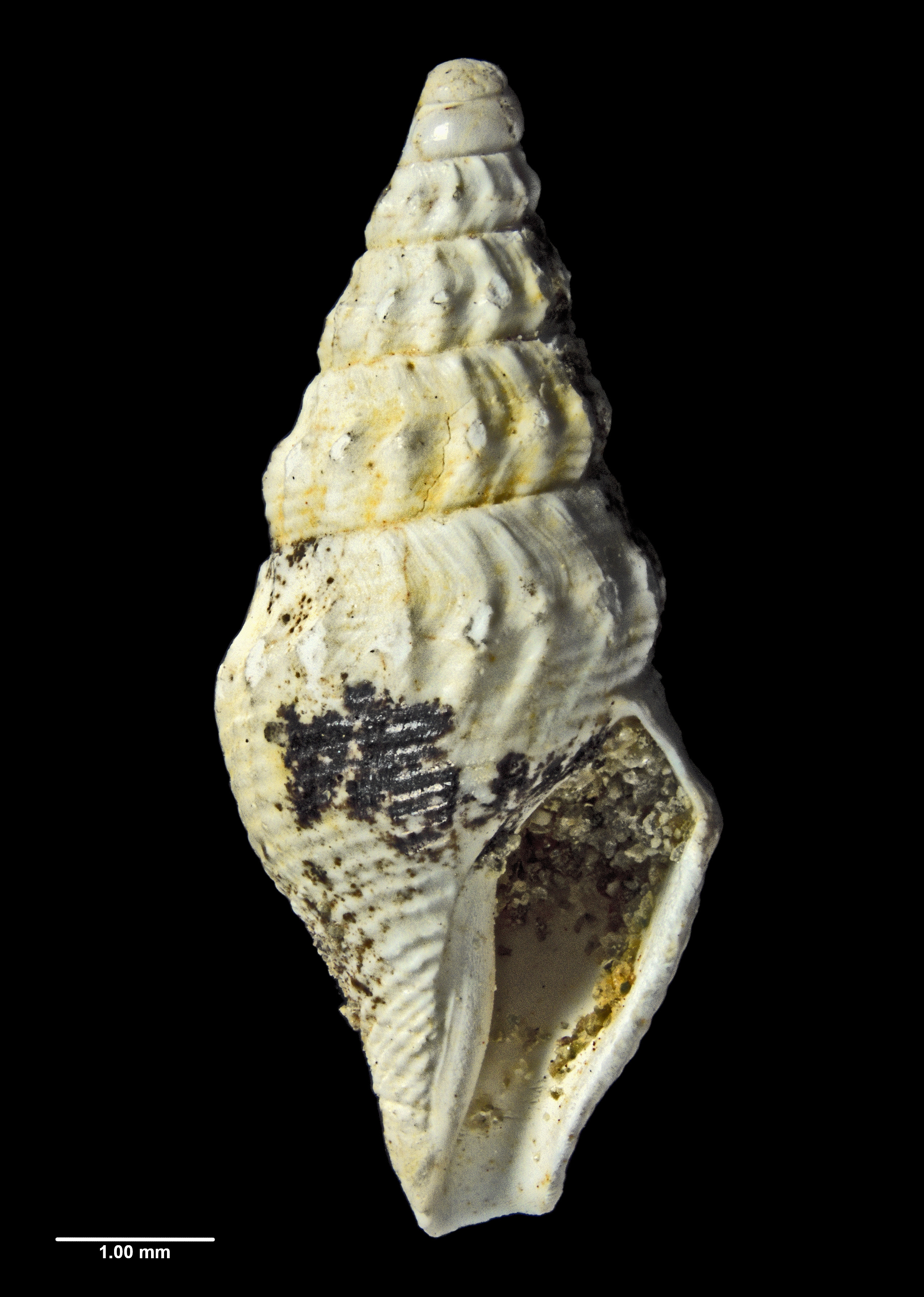
- Holotype from Auckland War Memorial Museum

Scientific classification
- Kingdom: Animalia
- Phylum: Mollusca
- Class: Gastropoda
- Subclass: Caenogastropoda
- Order: Neogastropoda
- Family: Horaiclavidae
- Genus: Mauidrillia
- Species: †M. unilirata

Binomial name
- †Mauidrillia unilirata A. W. B. Powell, 1942

= Mauidrillia unilirata =

Mauidrillia unilirata Temporal range: early Miocene

Extinct species of gastropod

Mauidrillia unilirata is an extinct species of sea snail, a marine gastropod mollusc in the family Horaiclavidae. Fossils of the species date to the early Miocene, and are found in the Mount Harris Formation near Oamaru, Otago, New Zealand.

== Description ==
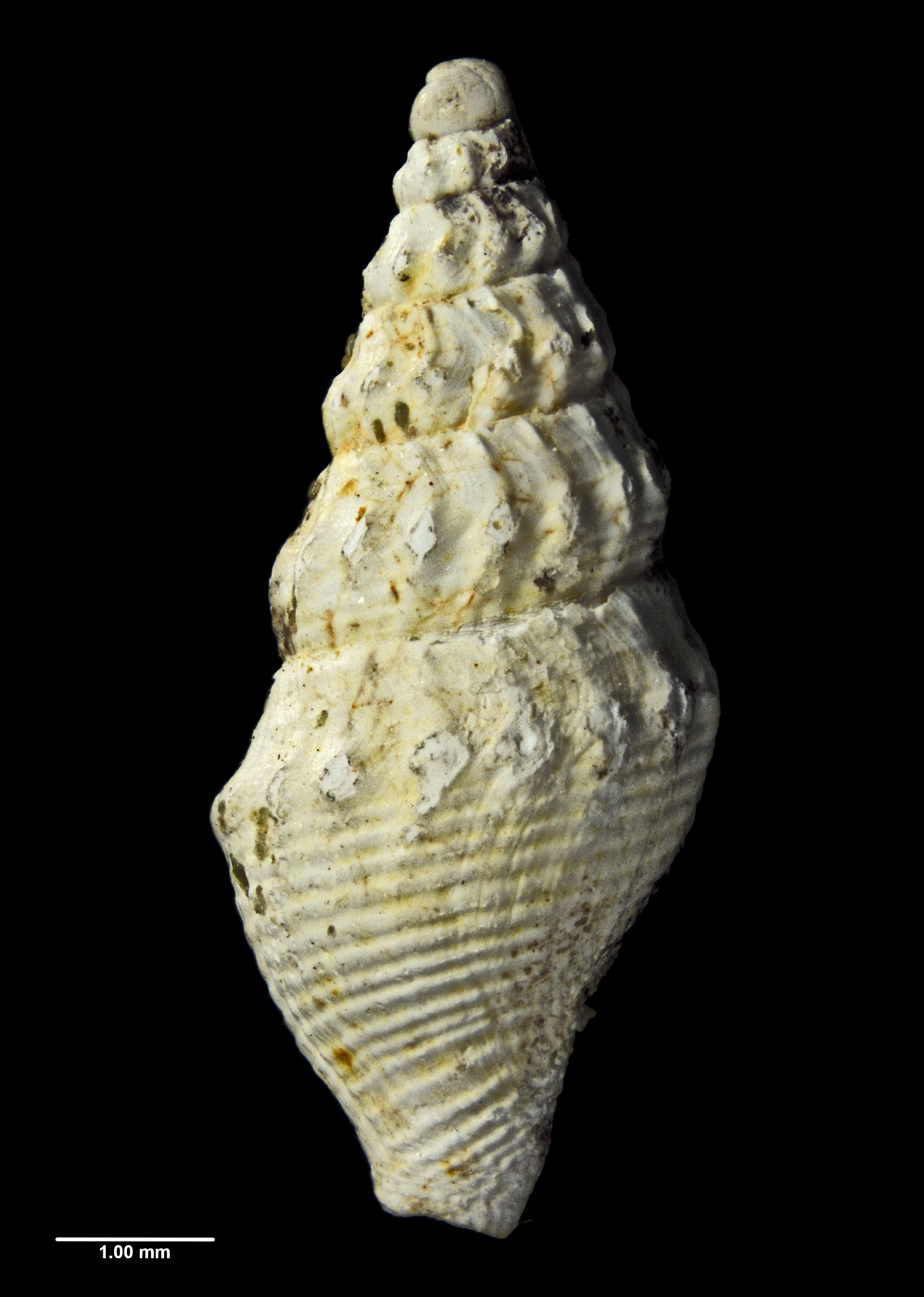
Reverse view of holotype

The species has a moderately sized shell, with 6 whorls and strongly angulate whorls and a deeply concave shoulder and weak sutural cord. The shell has 15 thin and sinuous axials per whorl. The holotype of the species measures 7.5 mm (0.30 in) in height and 3.2 mm (0.13 in) in diameter.

Powell noted similarities between M. unilirata and M. cinctuta.

== Taxonomy ==
The species was first described by A.W.B. Powell in 1942. The holotype was collected from Ardgowan near Oamaru, Otago at an unknown date prior to 1943, and is held by the Auckland War Memorial Museum.

== Distribution ==
This extinct marine species occurs in early Miocene strata of the Mount Harris Formation near Oamaru, Otago, New Zealand.
