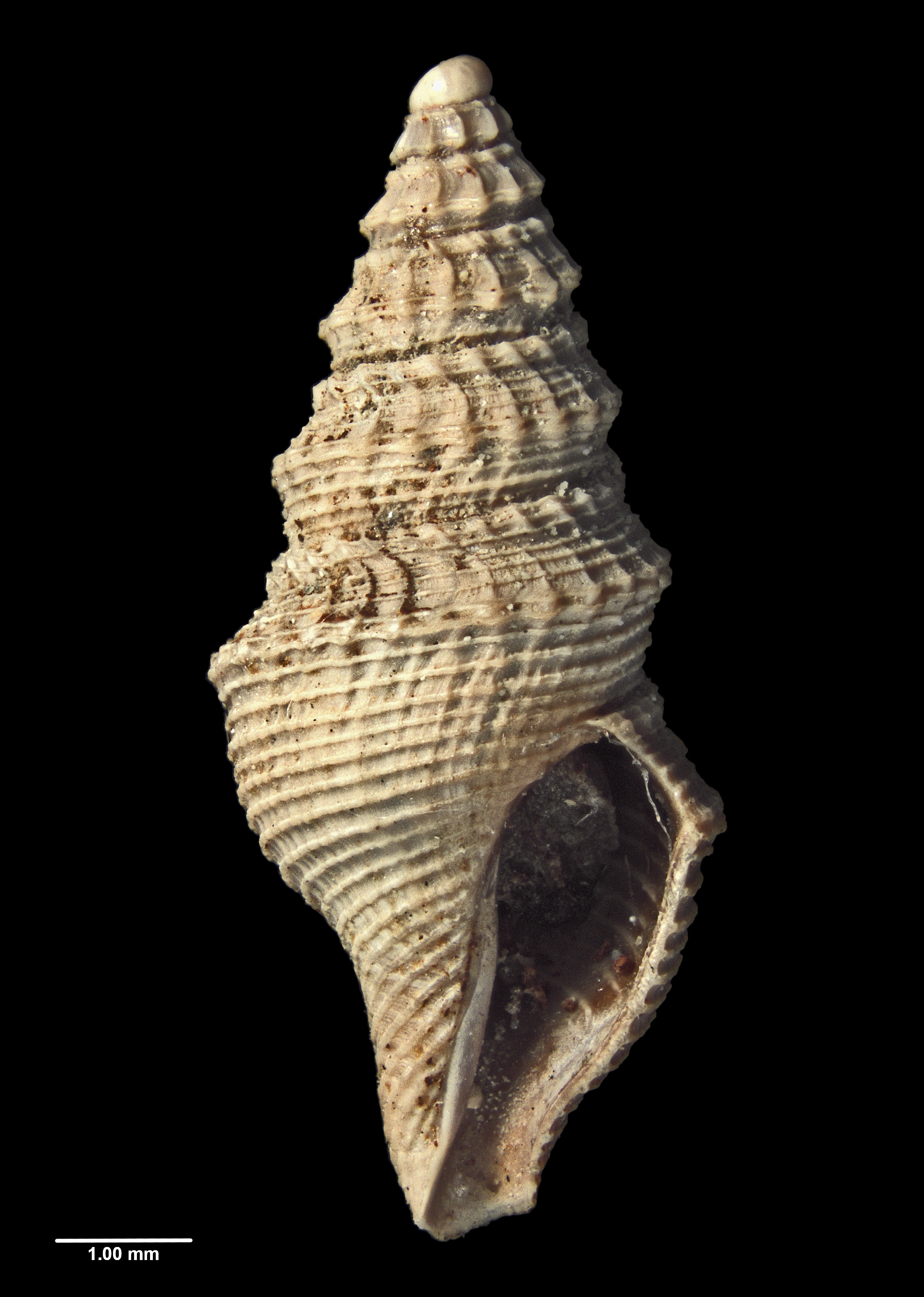
- Holotype from Auckland War Memorial Museum

Scientific classification
- Kingdom: Animalia
- Phylum: Mollusca
- Class: Gastropoda
- Subclass: Caenogastropoda
- Order: Neogastropoda
- Family: Horaiclavidae
- Genus: Mauidrillia
- Species: †M. serrulata

Binomial name
- †Mauidrillia serrulata A. W. B. Powell, 1944

= Mauidrillia serrulata =

Mauidrillia serrulata Temporal range: middle Miocene

Extinct species of gastropod

Mauidrillia serrulata is an extinct species of sea snail, a marine gastropod mollusc in the family Horaiclavidae. Fossils of the species date to the middle Miocene strata of the Port Phillip Basin of Victoria, Australia.

== Description ==
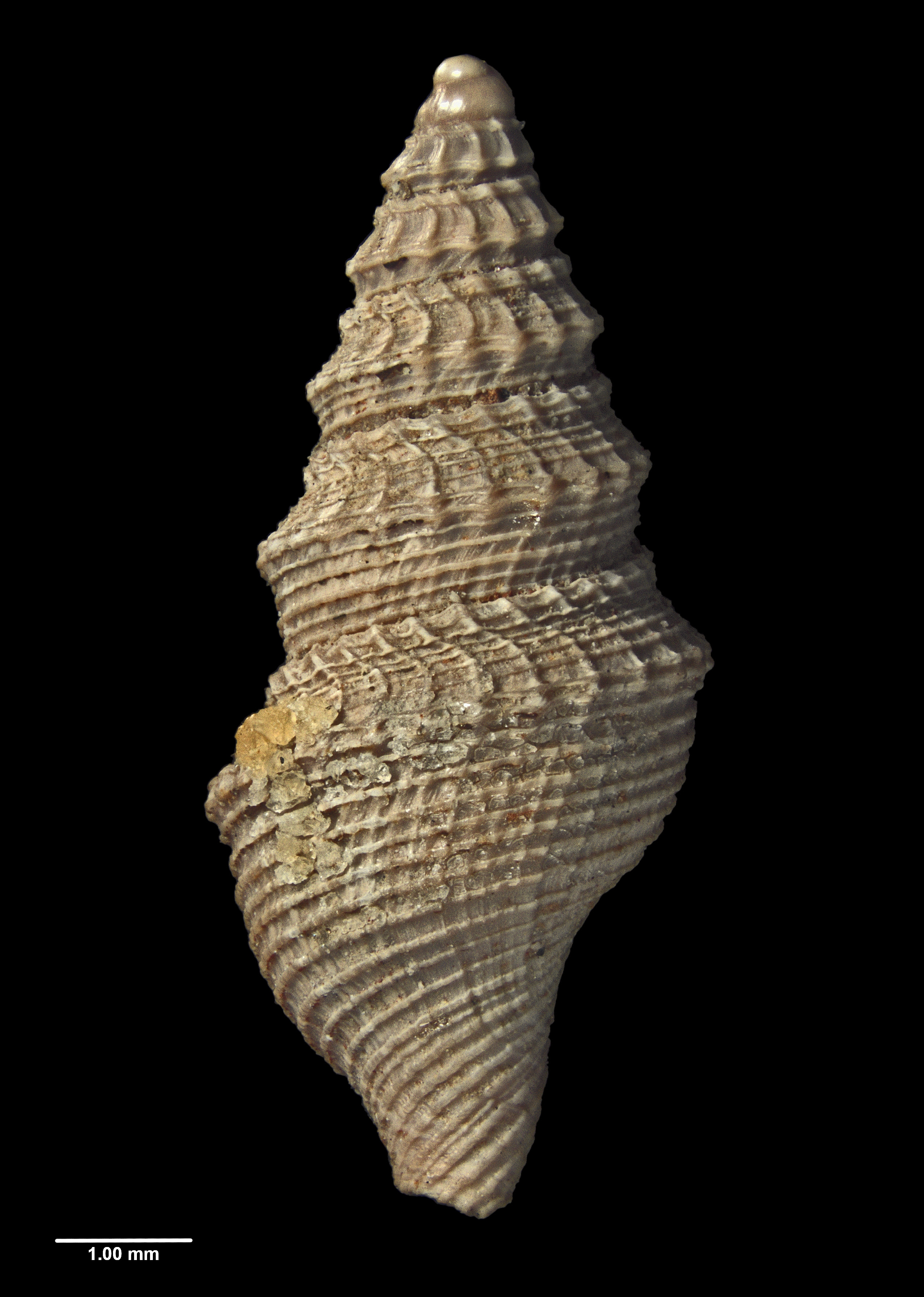
Reverse view of holotype

In the original description, Powell described the species as follows:

Species close to consutilis, but with a sharply projecting double carina which is delicately serrated by the crossing of numerous axial threads. Serrations about 25 per whorl. Subsutural fold bearing two spiral threads, three on shoulder, two heavier linear-spaced cords forming the carina, and 2 to 5 beneath it. On the body-whorl, from the carina to the anterior end, there are 19 narrow, flat-topped spiral cords, with interspaces double their width.

The holotype of the species measures 9 mm (0.35 in) in height and 4 mm (0.16 in) in diameter, and a paratype seen by Powell measured 12 mm (0.47 in) in height and 4.6 mm (0.18 in) in diameter.

== Taxonomy ==
The species was first described by A.W.B. Powell in 1944. The holotype was collected from Fossil Beach, Balcombe Bay in Victoria, Australia at an unknown date prior to 1945, and is held by the Auckland War Memorial Museum. In 1981, D. C. Long theorised that the late Eocene species M. aldingensis was ancestral to M. serrulata.

== Distribution ==
This extinct marine species occurs in middle Miocene strata of the Port Phillip Basin of Victoria, including the Gellibrand Formation.
