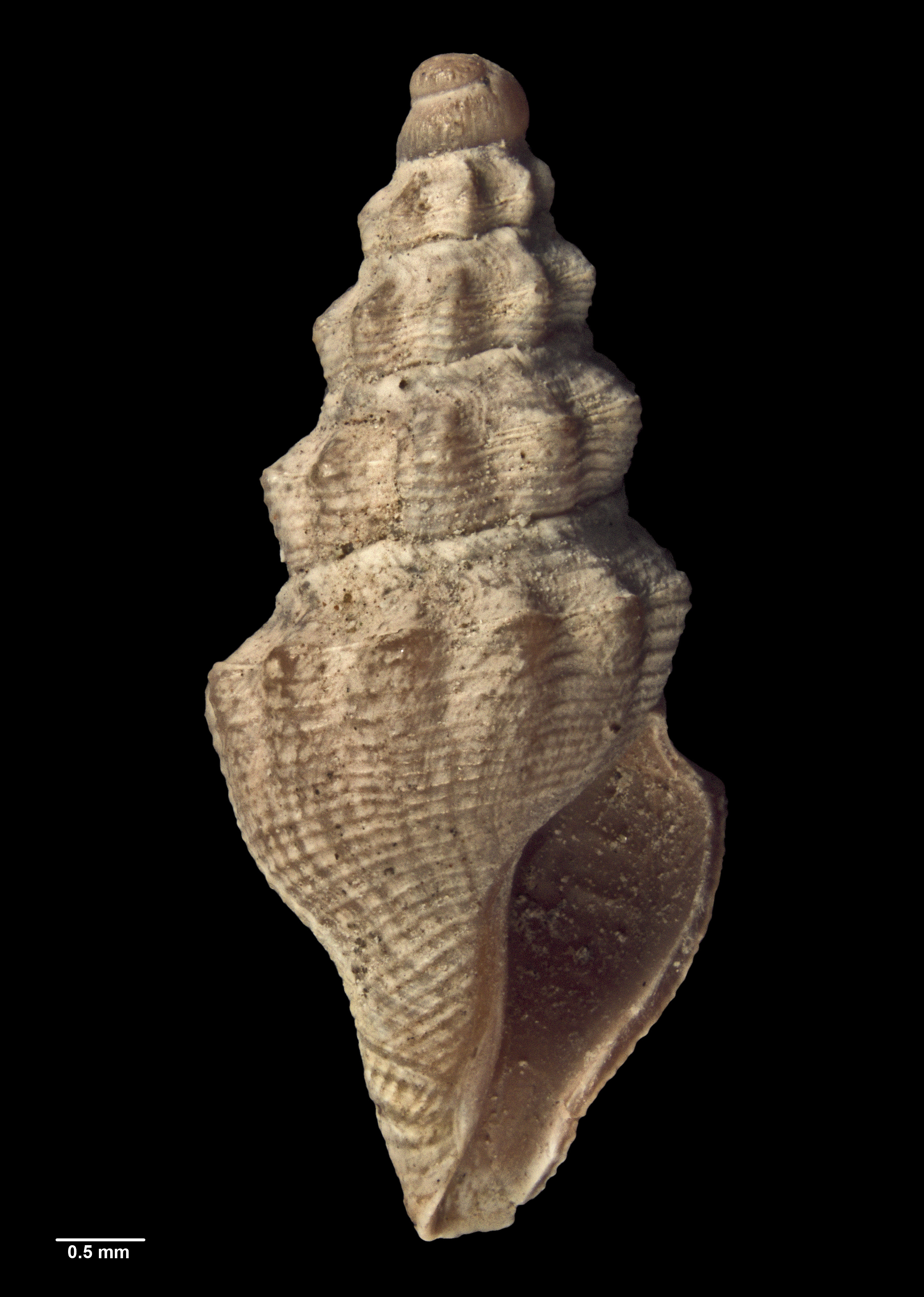
- Holotype from Auckland War Memorial Museum

Scientific classification
- Kingdom: Animalia
- Phylum: Mollusca
- Class: Gastropoda
- Subclass: Caenogastropoda
- Order: Neogastropoda
- Family: Horaiclavidae
- Genus: Mauidrillia
- Species: †M. imparilirata

Binomial name
- †Mauidrillia imparilirata A. W. B. Powell, 1942

= Mauidrillia imparilirata =

Mauidrillia imparilirata Temporal range: early Miocene

Extinct species of gastropod

Mauidrillia imparilirata is an extinct species of sea snail, a marine gastropod mollusc in the family Horaiclavidae. Fossils of the species date to the early Miocene strata of the Pakaurangi Formation, and are found at Pakurangi Point on the Kaipara Harbour, Northland, New Zealand, and in the southwestern Waikato Region.

== Description ==
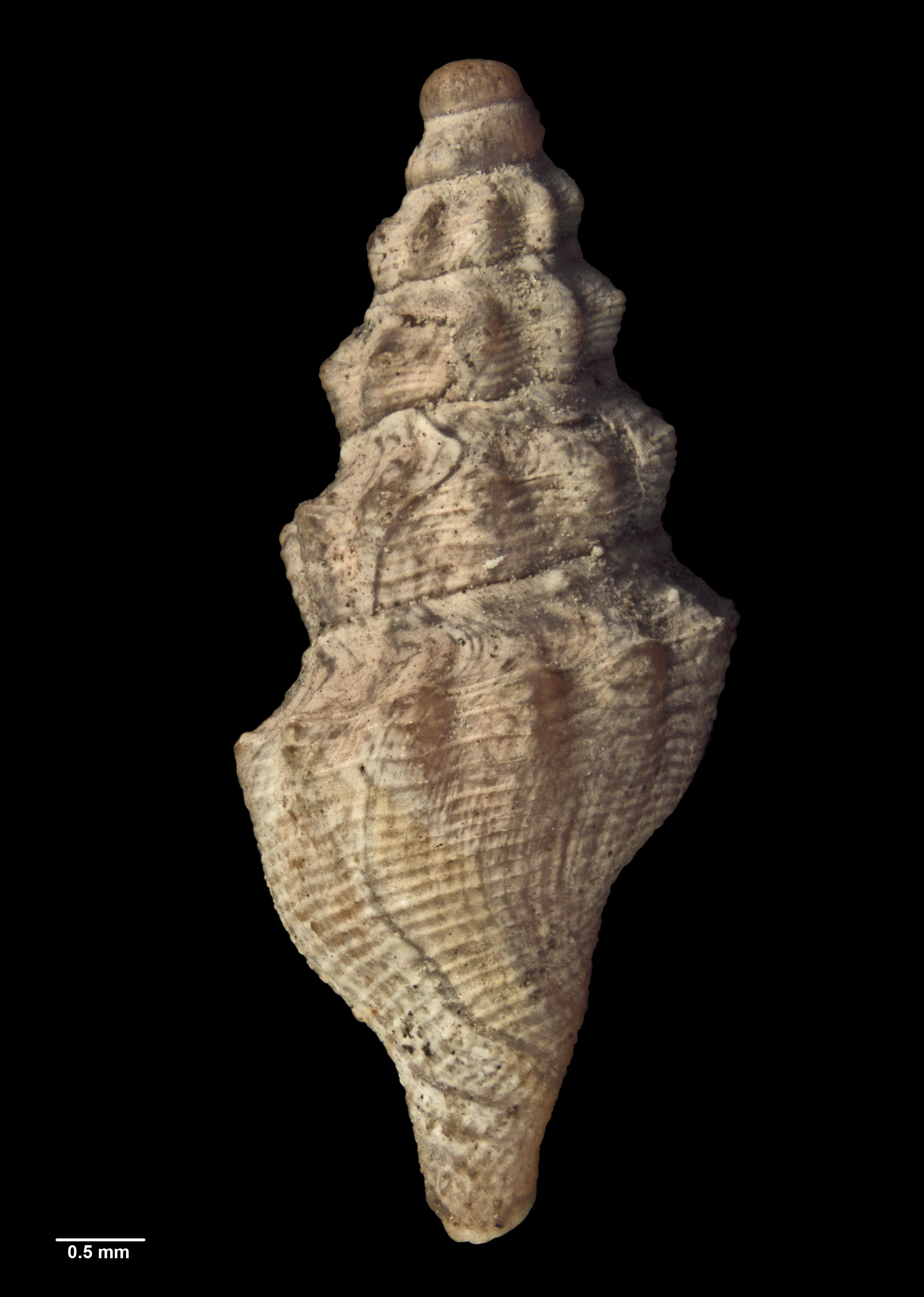
Reverse view of holotype

The species has a smaller shell and shorter canal than Mauidrillia inaequalis, with carinate axials at the peripheral angle. The shells have 5.5 whorls, including a protonconch of 1.5 whorls that do not extend to the upper suture. The spirals are very weak on the shoulder, but crisp below. The holotype of the species measures 6.8 mm (0.27 in) in height and 3.0 mm (0.12 in) in diameter.

== Taxonomy ==
The species was first described by A.W.B. Powell in 1942. The holotype was collected from the Target Gully Shellbed at Glen Creek, Oamaru, Otago, New Zealand at an unknown date prior to 1943, and is held by the Auckland War Memorial Museum.

== Distribution ==
This extinct marine species occurs in early Miocene strata of the Pakaurangi Formation at Pakurangi Point on the Kaipara Harbour, Northland, New Zealand. It is also known from blue mudstone strata in the Awakino Gorge.
