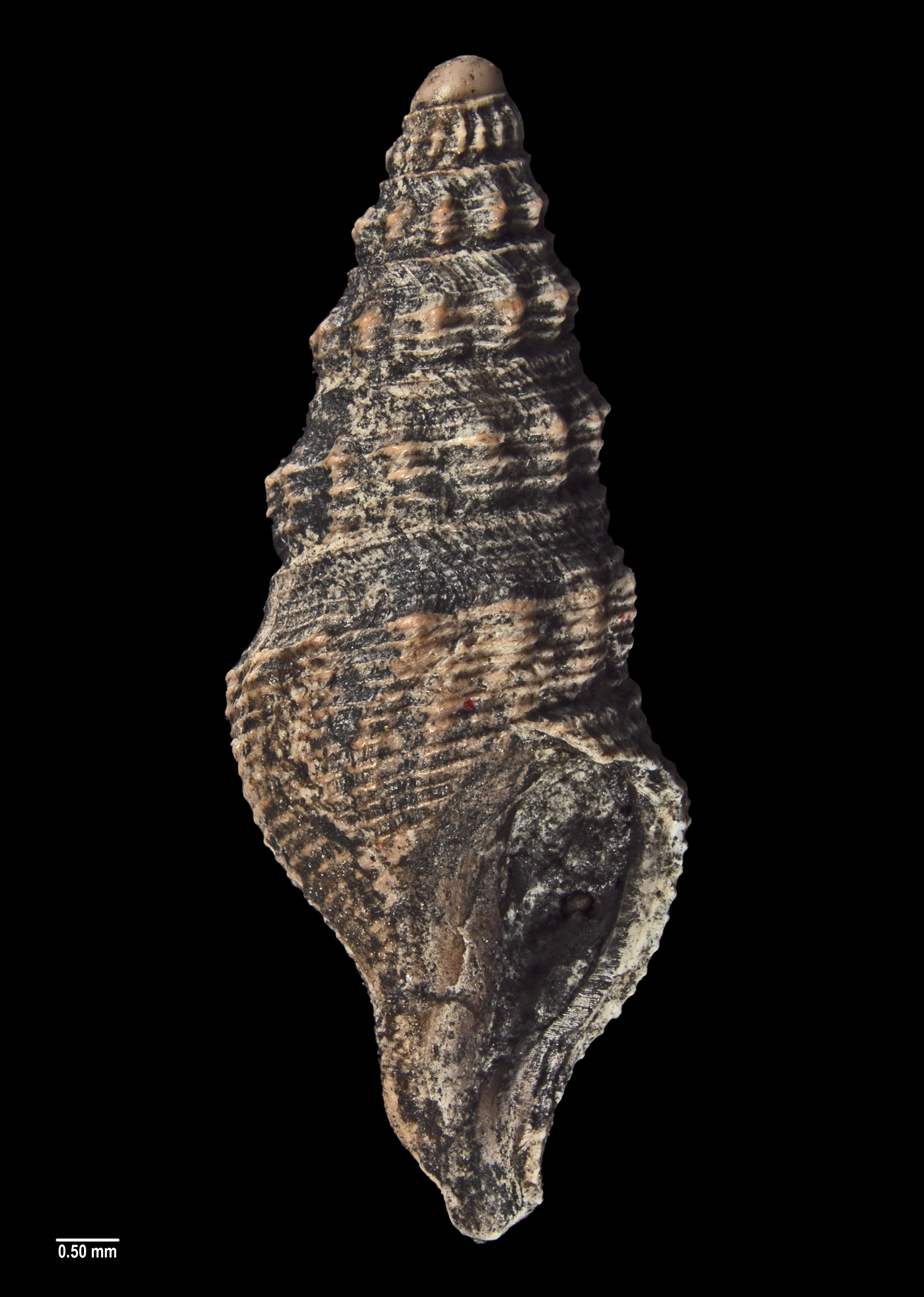
- Holotype from Auckland War Memorial Museum

Scientific classification
- Kingdom: Animalia
- Phylum: Mollusca
- Class: Gastropoda
- Subclass: Caenogastropoda
- Order: Neogastropoda
- Family: Horaiclavidae
- Genus: Mauidrillia
- Species: †M. aldingensis

Binomial name
- †Mauidrillia aldingensis A. W. B. Powell, 1944

= Mauidrillia aldingensis =

Mauidrillia aldingensis Temporal range: late Eocene

Extinct species of gastropod

Mauidrillia aldingensis is an extinct species of sea snail, a marine gastropod mollusc in the family Horaiclavidae. Fossils of the species date to the late Eocene, and have been found in strata of the St Vincent Basin of South Australia, and the Otway Basin of South Australia and Victoria.

== Description ==
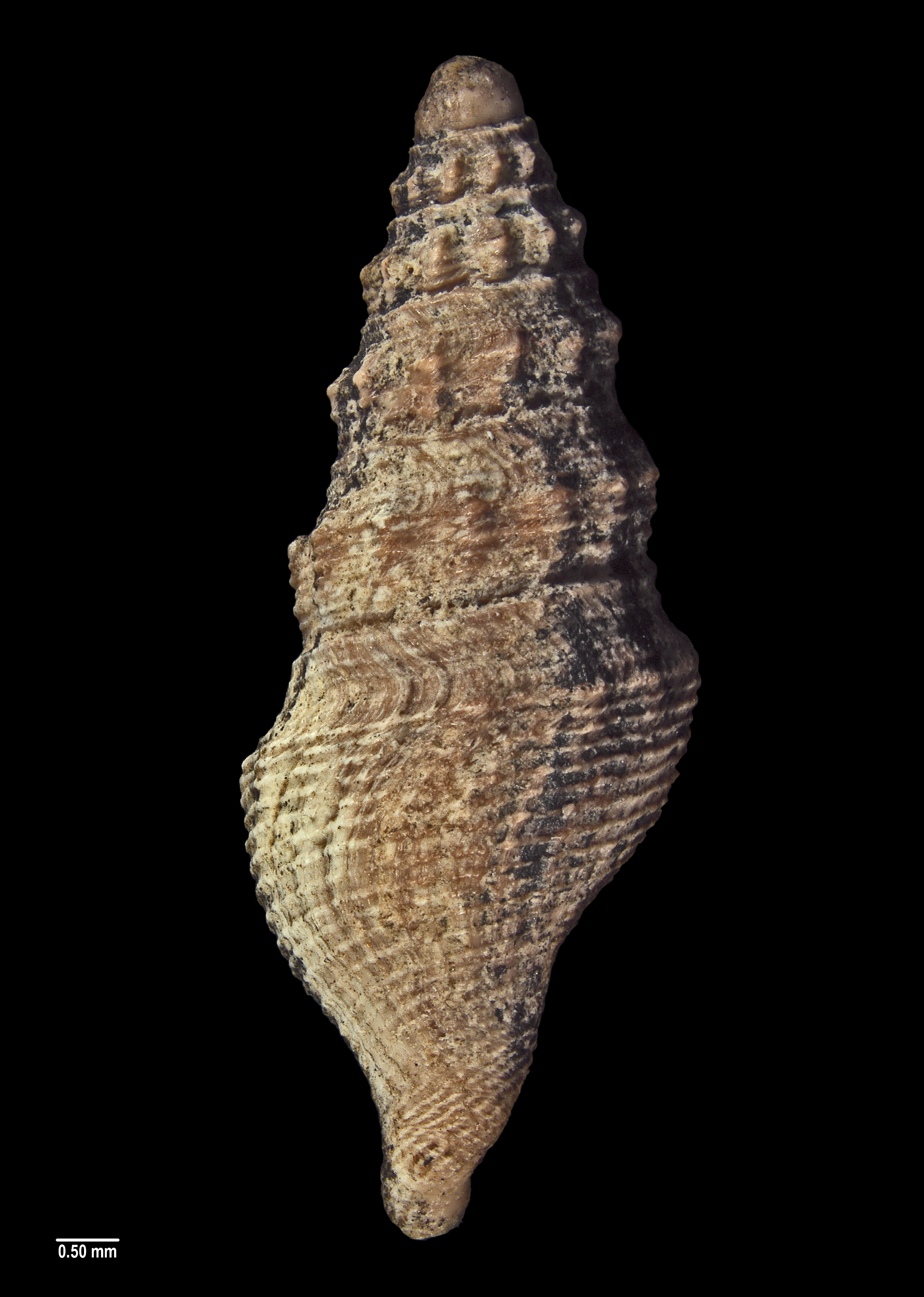
Reverse view of holotype

In the original description, Powell described the species as follows:

A robust, strongly sculptured species with the axials developed into vertically compressed tubercles where crossed by the carina. Suture bordered below by a narrow, sharp cord, three spiral threads on the shoulder, followed by the peripheral carina and two equally strong cords below it. On the body-whorl the development of intermediates increases the spirals to seven from the carina to the lower suture; there are about 29 spirals from the carina to the anterior end. Axials 13 per whorl, plus numerous fine axial threads which obliquely fenestrate the shoulder spirals.

The holotype of the species measures 9.5 mm (0.37 in) in height and 3.8 mm (0.15 in) in diameter. The species has a protoconch of between 1.3-2.0 whorls (typically 1.5).

== Taxonomy ==
The species was first described by A.W.B. Powell in 1944. The holotype was collected from the Blanche Point Formation in Aldinga, South Australia at an unknown date prior to 1945, and is held by the Auckland War Memorial Museum.

D. C. Long theorised that M. aldingensis was an ancestral species of the Oligocene-Miocene species M. torquayensis, M. pullulascens, M. trispiralis, M. consutilis, M. partinoda and M. serrulata.

== Ecology ==
M. aldingensis was an epifaunal carnivore.

== Distribution ==
This extinct marine species occurs in late Eocene strata of the St Vincent Basin and Otway Basin, including the Blanche Point Formation and Browns Creek Formation of South Australia and Victoria. A fossil found in the Southern Carnarvon Basin of Western Australia dating to the Middle-Late Eocene may represent an occurrence of M. aldingensis, however this fossil differed morphologically by having more tumid whorls and a more elongated canal.
