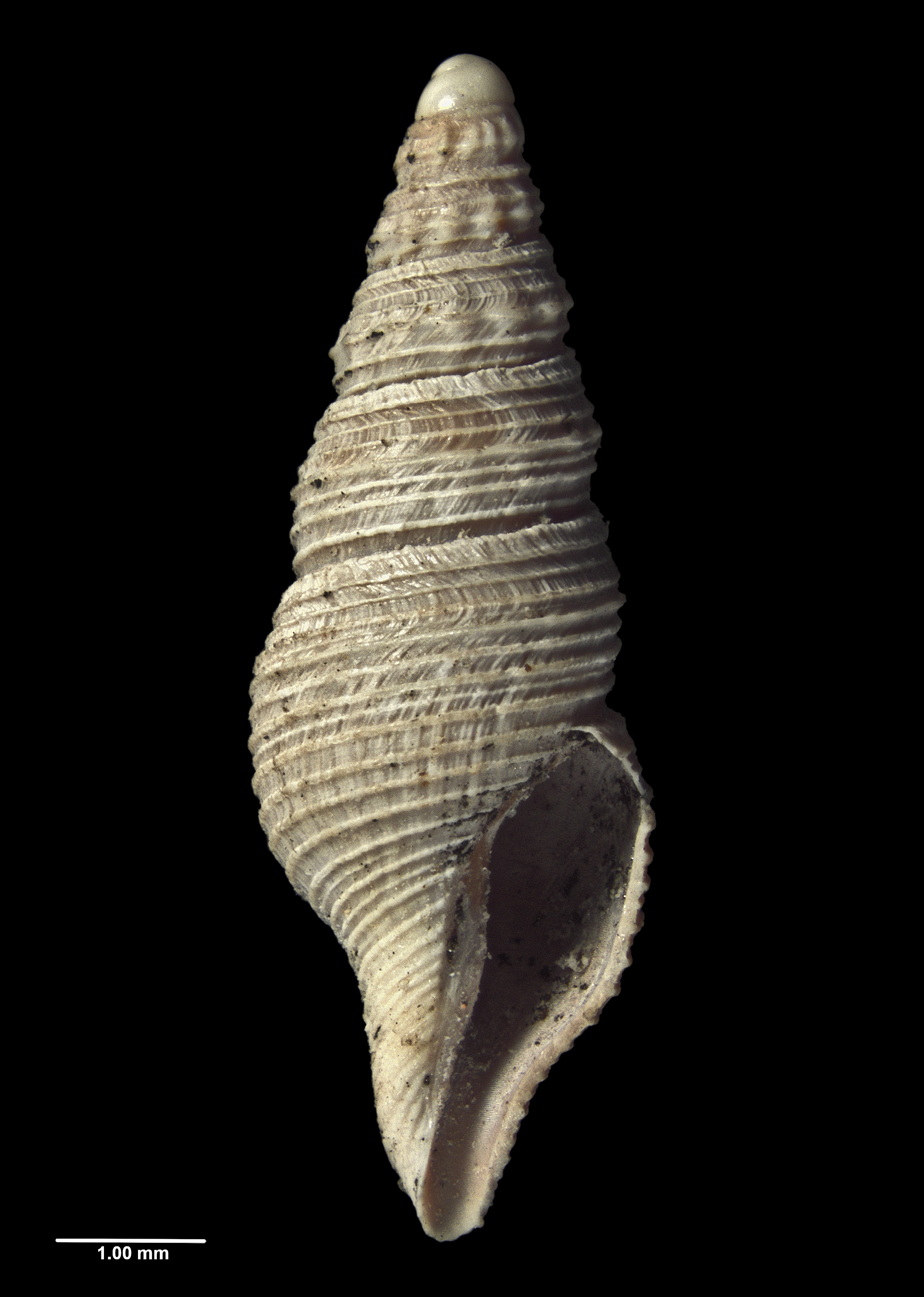
- Holotype from Auckland War Memorial Museum

Scientific classification
- Kingdom: Animalia
- Phylum: Mollusca
- Class: Gastropoda
- Subclass: Caenogastropoda
- Order: Neogastropoda
- Family: Horaiclavidae
- Genus: Mauidrillia
- Species: †M. partinoda

Binomial name
- †Mauidrillia partinoda A. W. B. Powell, 1944

= Mauidrillia partinoda =

Mauidrillia partinoda Temporal range: middle Miocene

Extinct species of gastropod

Mauidrillia partinoda is an extinct species of sea snail, a marine gastropod mollusc in the family Horaiclavidae. Fossils of the species date to the middle Miocene strata of the Port Phillip Basin of Victoria, Australia.

== Description ==
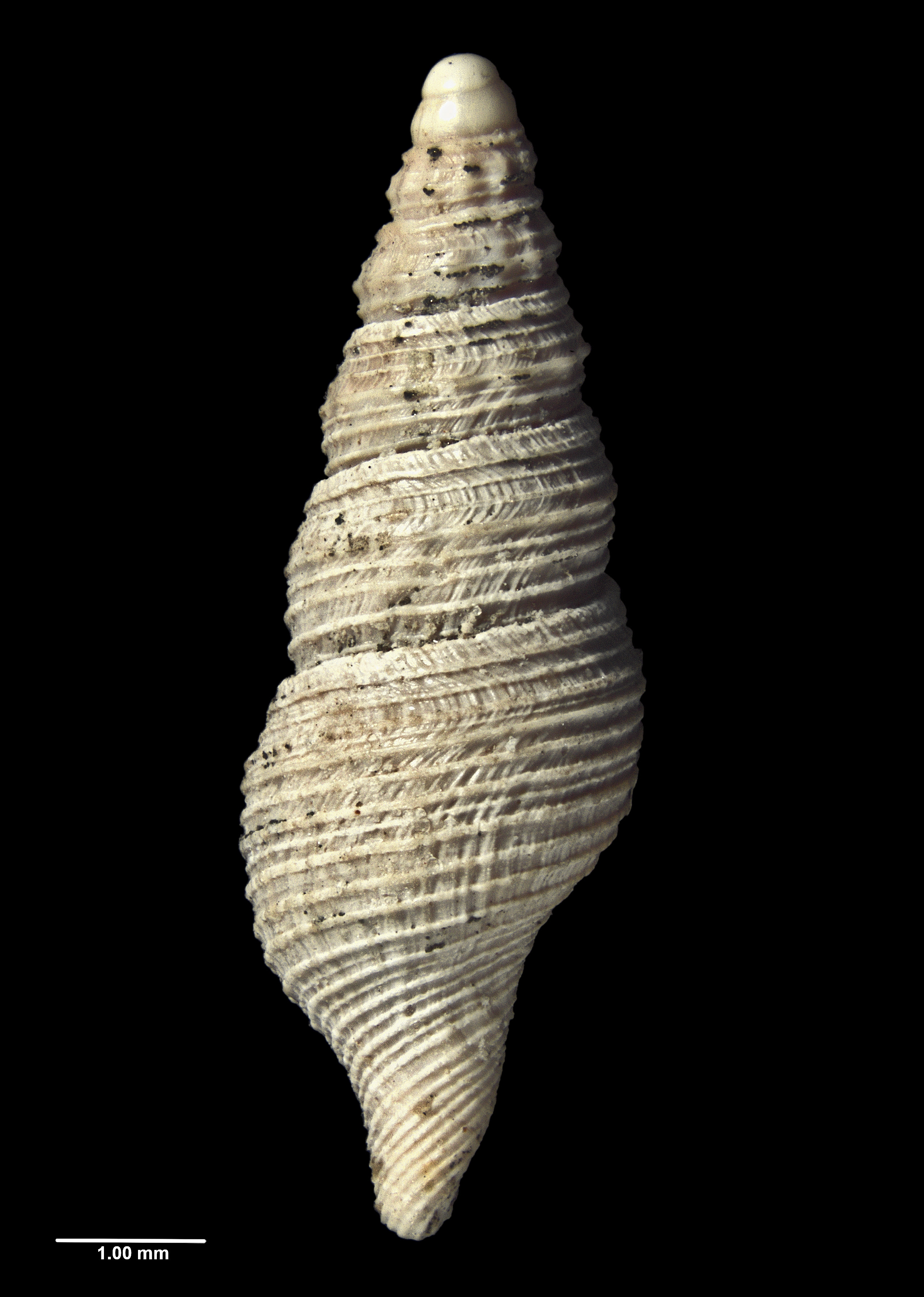
Reverse view of holotype

In the original description, Powell described the species as follows:

Species close to Mauidrillia pullulascens|pullulascens, but with the axials reduced to weak tubercles on the carina of the first two to three post-nuclear whorls only, 11 per whorl. Spiral sculpture consisting of a subsutural margining cord, two weaker cords on the shoulder, the moderately strong peripheral cord at the middle of the whorls, 2 to 3 weaker cords below it, plus 8 on the base and a further 8 linear-spaced threads on the anterior end. The whorls are only slightly angled.

The holotype of the species measures 8.4 mm (0.33 in) in height and 4 mm (0.16 in) in diameter.

== Taxonomy ==
The species was first described by A.W.B. Powell in 1944. The holotype was collected from Fossil Beach, Balcombe Bay, Victoria at an unknown date prior to 1945, and is held by the Auckland War Memorial Museum. In 1981, D. C. Long theorised that the late Eocene species M. aldingensis was ancestral to M. partinoda.

== Distribution ==
This extinct marine species occurs in middle Miocene strata of the Port Phillip Basin of Victoria, including the Gellibrand Formation.
