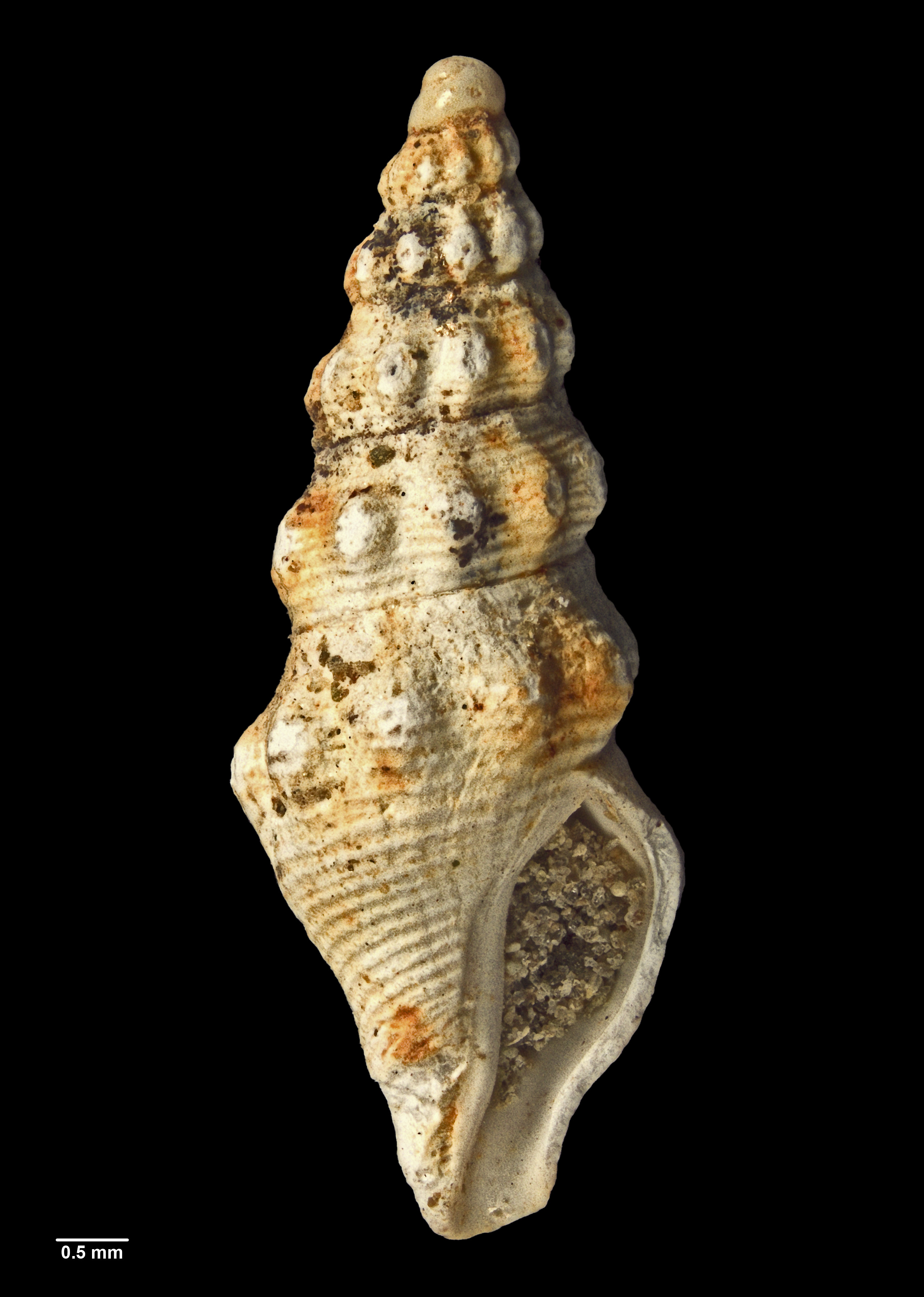
- Holotype from Auckland War Memorial Museum

Scientific classification
- Kingdom: Animalia
- Phylum: Mollusca
- Class: Gastropoda
- Subclass: Caenogastropoda
- Order: Neogastropoda
- Family: Horaiclavidae
- Genus: Mauidrillia
- Species: †M. clavicula

Binomial name
- †Mauidrillia clavicula A. W. B. Powell, 1942

= Mauidrillia clavicula =

Mauidrillia clavicula Temporal range: early Miocene

Extinct species of gastropod

Mauidrillia clavicula is an extinct species of sea snail, a marine gastropod mollusc in the family Horaiclavidae. Fossils of the species date to the early Miocene strata of the Mount Harris Formation at Glen Creek, Oamaru, Otago, New Zealand.

== Description ==
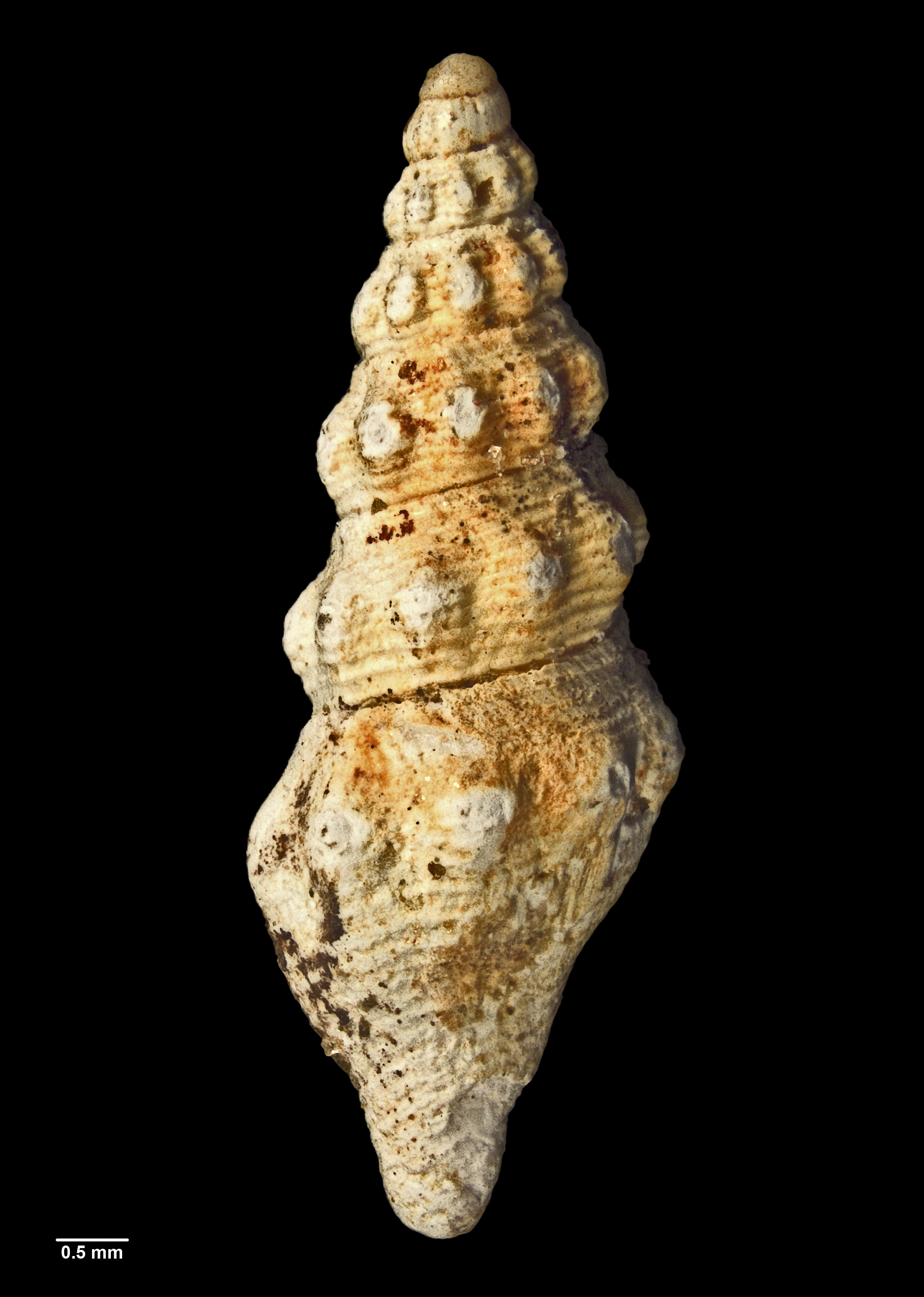
Reverse view of holotype

The species has a small shell with a spire 1.5 times the height of the combined length of the aperture and canal. The shell has 6.5 whorls, including a protoconch of 1.5 whorls. The middle of the shell has strongly angled whorls, and the shell has weak suture cord margining. The axials appear as strongly blunt knobs at angles, and do not extend to the sutures. There are between 9-12 axials per whorl, with ten found on the penultimate whorl. The holotype of the species measures 8.25 mm (0.325 in) in height and 3.1 mm (0.12 in) in diameter.

== Taxonomy ==
The species was first described by A.W.B. Powell in 1942. The holotype was collected from the Target Gully Shellbed at Glen Creek, Oamaru, Otago, New Zealand at an unknown date prior to 1943, and is held by the Auckland War Memorial Museum.

== Distribution ==
This extinct marine species occurs in early Miocene strata of the Mount Harris Formation at Glen Creek, Oamaru, Otago, New Zealand.
