= Mauidrillia costifer =

Scientific classification
- Kingdom: Animalia
- Phylum: Mollusca
- Class: Gastropoda
- Subclass: Caenogastropoda
- Order: Neogastropoda
- Superfamily: Conoidea
- Family: Horaiclavidae
- Genus: Mauidrillia
- Species: M. costifer

Binomial name
- Mauidrillia costifer (Suter, 1917)

Synonyms
- † Drillia (Crassispira) costifer Suter 1917

Extinct species of gastropod

Mauidrillia costifer is an extinct species of sea snail, a marine gastropod mollusk in the family Horaiclavidae.

== Description ==
The length of the shell varies between 7 mm and 8 mm.

The snail's body color is mainly pale, with a long, slender proboscis that they used for feeding and mating. The eyes of the snail are located at the base of the tentacles and are usually not visible from the outside.

M. costifer is comparatively small, usually measuring less than 1 cm in length, although individuals can have different sizes depending on factors such as age, habitat, and food availability.

== Distribution ==
This extinct marine species is endemic to New Zealand
