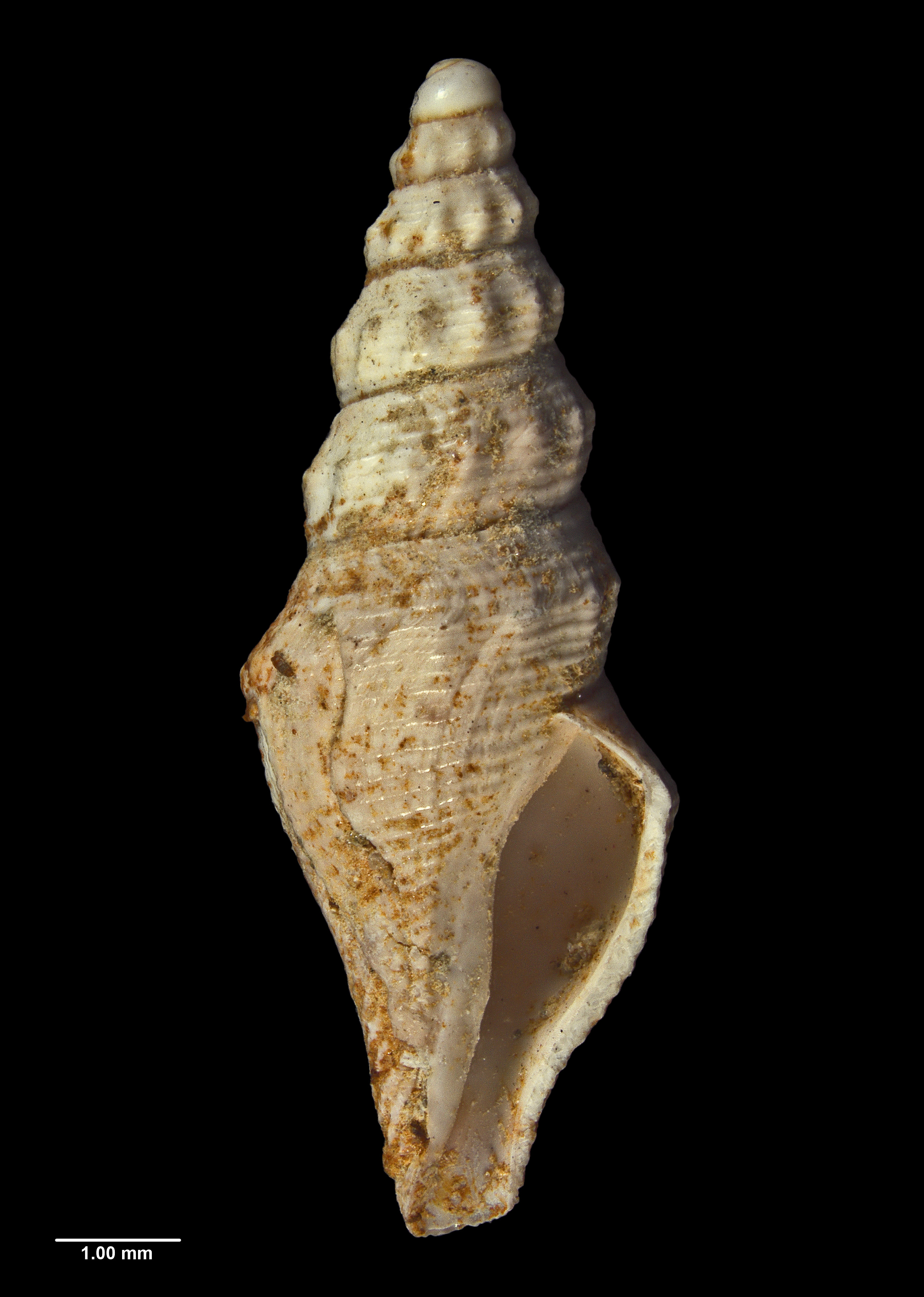
- Mauidrillia angustata

Scientific classification
- Kingdom: Animalia
- Phylum: Mollusca
- Class: Gastropoda
- Subclass: Caenogastropoda
- Order: Neogastropoda
- Superfamily: Conoidea
- Family: Horaiclavidae
- Genus: Mauidrillia; A.W.B. Powell, 1942

Type species
- Mangilia praecophinodes (Suter, 1917)

Species
- See text

= Mauidrillia =

Mauidrillia Temporal range: early Eocene–recent

Genus of gastropods

Mauidrillia is a genus of sea snails, marine gastropod molluscs in the family Horaiclavidae, the turrids. The genus has one known living member, Mauidrillia felina, found in the waters of South Africa. Fossils of the genus date back to the early Eocene, and are found in Australia, New Zealand, Germany and Japan.

== Description ==
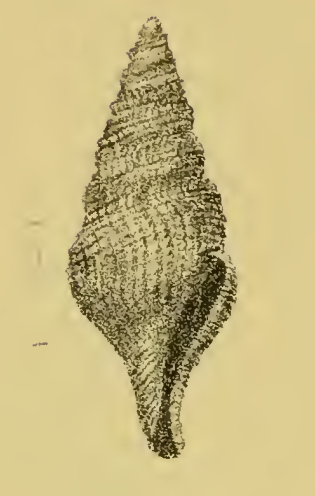
Mauidrillia consutilis

Members of Mauidrilla have a globular protoconch of two smooth whorls, a lack of insertion callus, and a broad, relatively shallow subsutural sinus found on the majority of the shoulder of its shells.

== Taxonomy ==
The genus was first described by Baden Powell in 1942, who named Mangilia praecophinodes (current accepted name Mauidrillia praecophinodes) as the type species. While previously considered a fossil taxon, a living member of the genus was discovered in 1988, Mauidrillia felina. The genus was assigned to the family Horaiclavidae in 2011.

== Distribution and habitat ==
The sole extant member of the genus, M. felina, is found on the continental slope east of Eastern Cape, South Africa, at a depth between 300–446 m (984–1,463 ft). An undescribed species found near the South Island of New Zealand may represent another extant species in the genus.

Fossil members of the genus occur in Australia, New Zealand, Germany and Japan, with the earliest known fossils dating to the early Eocene.

== Species ==
Species within the genus Mauidrillia include:

- † Mauidrillia acuta (Marwick, 1928)
- † Mauidrillia aldingensis Powell, 1944
- † Mauidrillia angustata Powell, 1942
- † Mauidrillia browni Marwick, 1943
- † Mauidrillia cinctuta (Marwick, 1929)
- † Mauidrillia clavicula Powell, 1942
- † Mauidrillia consutilis (Tenison-Woods, 1880)
- † Mauidrillia costifer (Suter, 1917)
- Mauidrillia felina Kilburn, 1988
- † Mauidrillia fimbriata Laws, 1947
- † Mauidrillia granulosa Shuto, 1961
- † Mauidrillia imparilirata Powell, 1942
- † Mauidrillia inaequalis Powell, 1942
- † Mauidrillia incerta Beu, 1970
- † Mauidrillia intumescens Powell, 1944
- † Mauidrillia occidentalis Maxwell, 1988
- † Mauidrillia otwayensis D. C. Long, 1981
- † Mauidrillia partinoda Powell, 1944
- † Mauidrillia praecophinodes (Suter, 1917)
- † Mauidrillia pullulascens (Tenison Woods, 1877)
- † Mauidrillia secta Powell, 1944
- † Mauidrillia serrulata Powell, 1944
- † Mauidrillia supralaevis Powell, 1942
- † Mauidrillia torquayensis Powell, 1944
- † Mauidrillia trispiralis Powell, 1944
- † Mauidrillia turrita (Chapple, 1941)
- † Mauidrillia unilirata Powell, 1942
