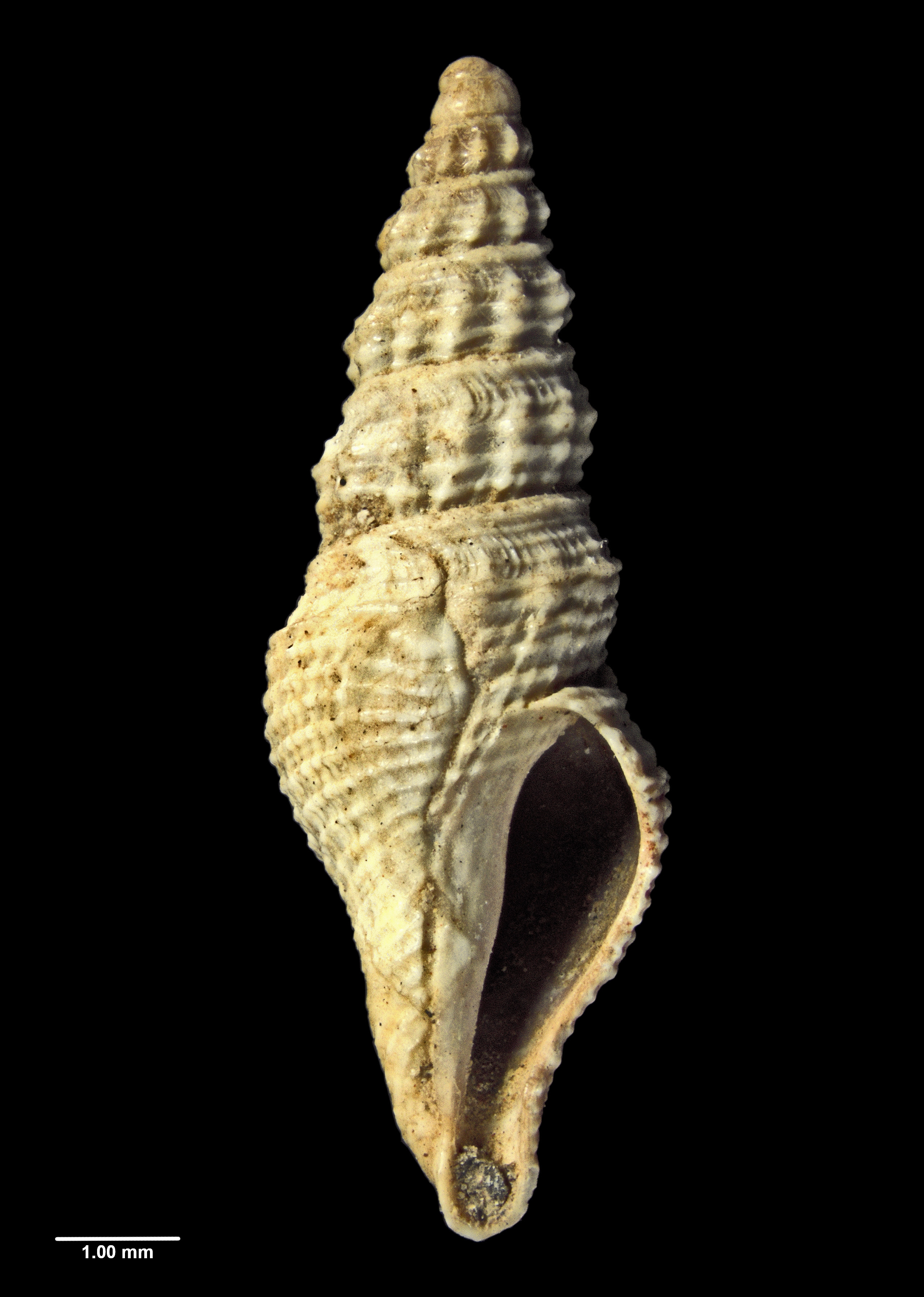
- Holotype from Auckland War Memorial Museum

Scientific classification
- Kingdom: Animalia
- Phylum: Mollusca
- Class: Gastropoda
- Subclass: Caenogastropoda
- Order: Neogastropoda
- Family: Horaiclavidae
- Genus: Mauidrillia
- Species: †M. trispiralis

Binomial name
- †Mauidrillia trispiralis A. W. B. Powell, 1944

= Mauidrillia trispiralis =

Mauidrillia trispiralis Temporal range: middle Miocene

Extinct species of gastropod

Mauidrillia trispiralis is an extinct species of sea snail, a marine gastropod mollusc in the family Horaiclavidae. Fossils of the species date to the middle Miocene strata of the Otway Basin of Victoria, Australia.

== Description ==
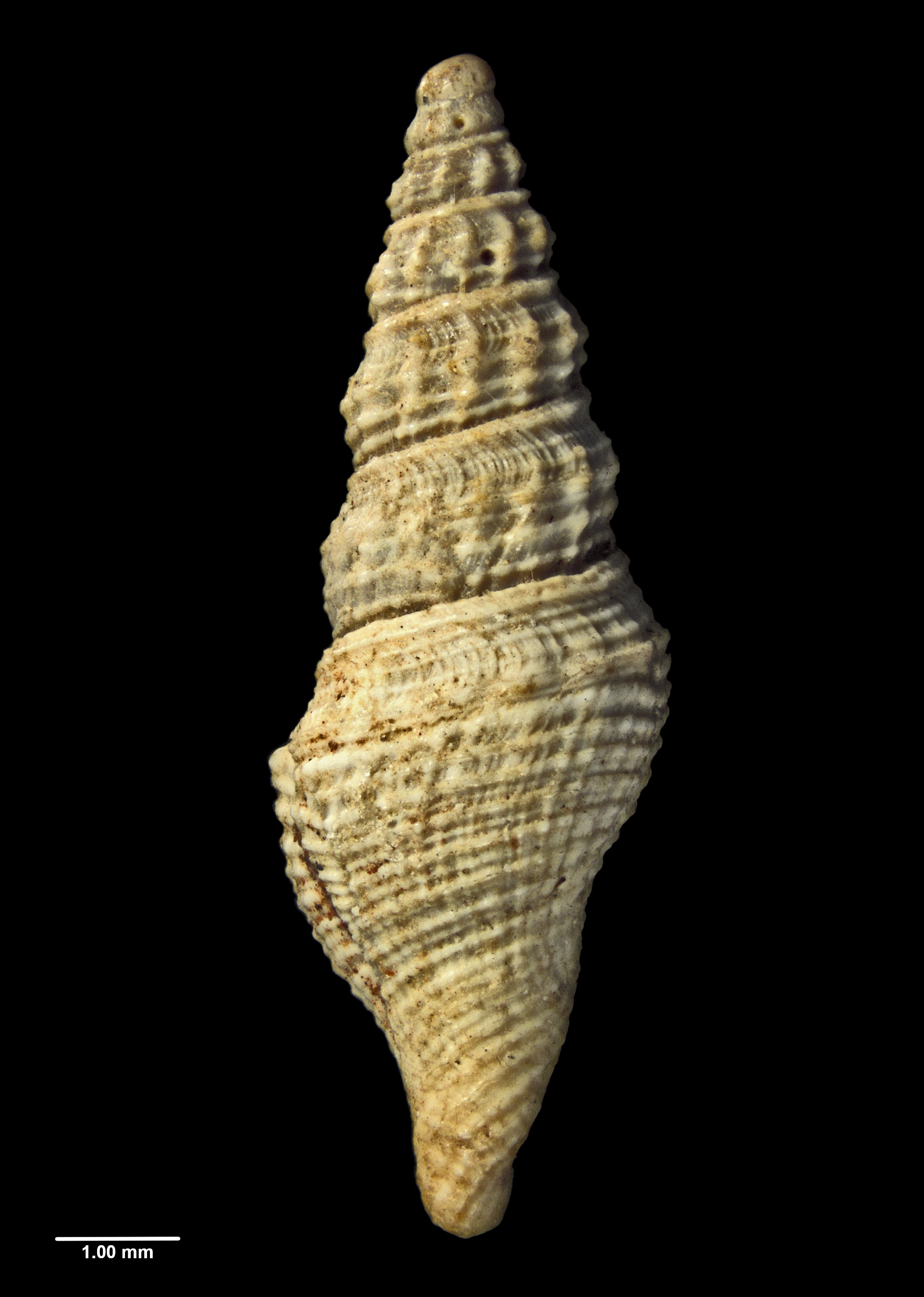
Reverse view of holotype

In the original description, Powell described the species as follows:

Shell very slender, sculptured with relatively few strong spirals which are rendered nodulose at the axial intersections. Subsutural fold strong, 2 to 3 threads on shoulder ; peripheral carina and two cords below it, all equally strong. About 19 cords on body-whorl from periphery to the anterior end. The holotype exhibits abnormal sculpture on the front of the body-whorl, due to a shell injury and its subsequent repair. Axials 13 per whorl, producing nodulation where they cross the three main spirals. Body-whorl crossed by numerous axial riblets which render the spirals weakly crenulate. The absence of strong axial nodulation on the body-whorl may be due to the shell injury already mentioned.

The holotype of the species measures 9.9 mm (0.39 in) in height and 3.5 mm (0.14 in) in diameter.

== Taxonomy ==
The species was first described by A.W.B. Powell in 1944. The holotype was collected from the Gellibrand River in Victoria, Australia at an unknown date prior to 1945, and is held by the Auckland War Memorial Museum. In 1981, D. C. Long theorised that the late Eocene species M. aldingensis was ancestral to M. torquayensis.

== Distribution ==
This extinct marine species occurs in middle Miocene strata of the Otway Basin of Victoria, including the Gellibrand Formation.
