= Mauidrillia fimbriata =

Scientific classification
- Kingdom: Animalia
- Phylum: Mollusca
- Class: Gastropoda
- Subclass: Caenogastropoda
- Order: Neogastropoda
- Superfamily: Conoidea
- Family: Horaiclavidae
- Genus: Mauidrillia
- Species: M. fimbriata

Binomial name
- Mauidrillia fimbriata Laws, 1947

Extinct species of gastropod

Mauidrillia fimbriata is an extinct species of sea snail, a marine gastropod mollusk in the family Horaiclavidae.

== Description ==
The length of the shell attains 8 mm, its diameter 3 mm.

== Distribution ==
This extinct marine species is endemic to New Zealand.
