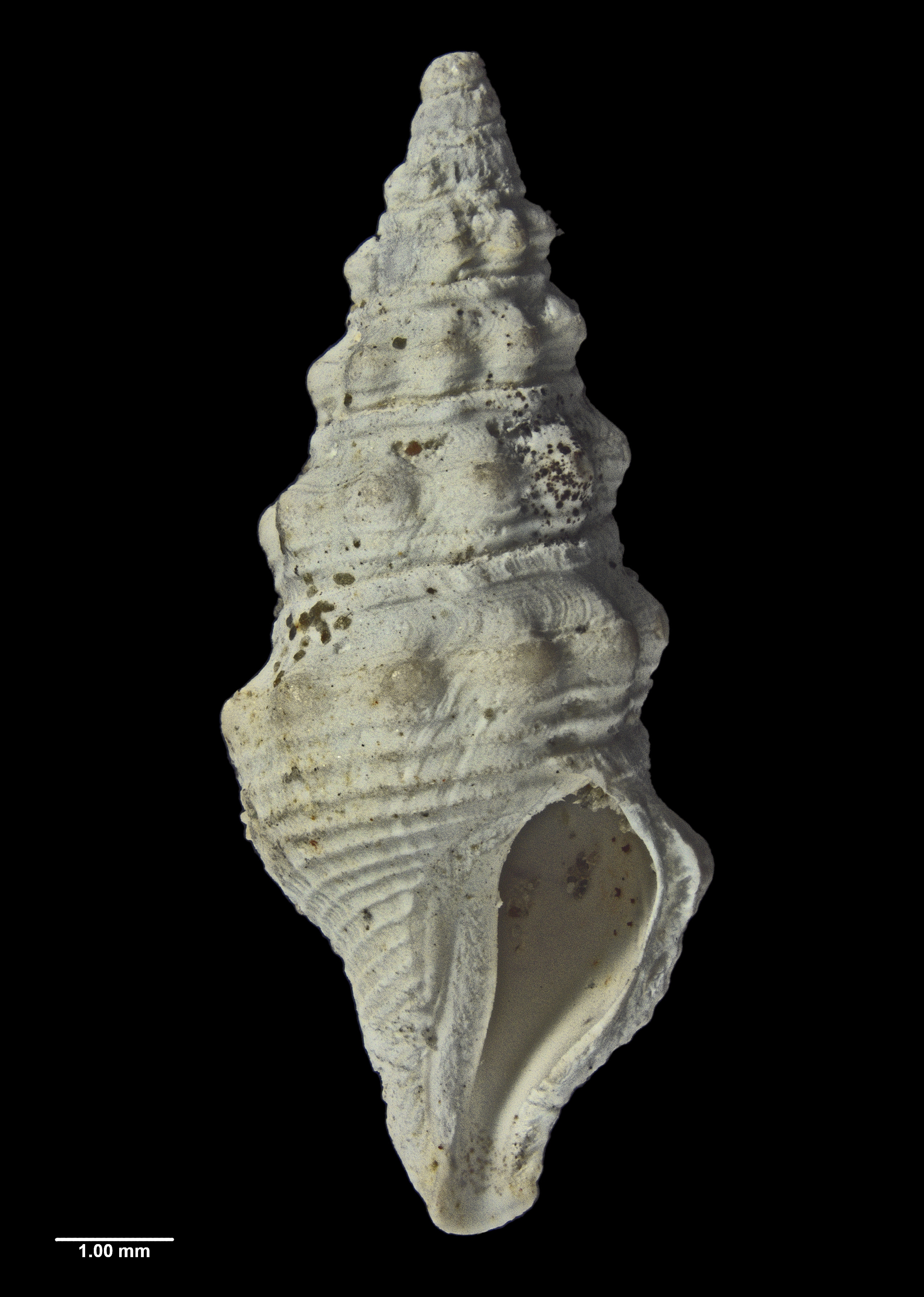
- Holotype from Auckland War Memorial Museum

Scientific classification
- Kingdom: Animalia
- Phylum: Mollusca
- Class: Gastropoda
- Subclass: Caenogastropoda
- Order: Neogastropoda
- Family: Horaiclavidae
- Genus: Mauidrillia
- Species: †M. supralaevis

Binomial name
- †Mauidrillia supralaevis A. W. B. Powell, 1942

= Mauidrillia supralaevis =

Mauidrillia supralaevis Temporal range: early Miocene

Extinct species of gastropod

Mauidrillia supralaevis is an extinct species of sea snail, a marine gastropod mollusc in the family Horaiclavidae. Fossils of the species date to the early Miocene, and are found in the Mount Harris Formation near Oamaru, Otago, New Zealand.

== Description ==
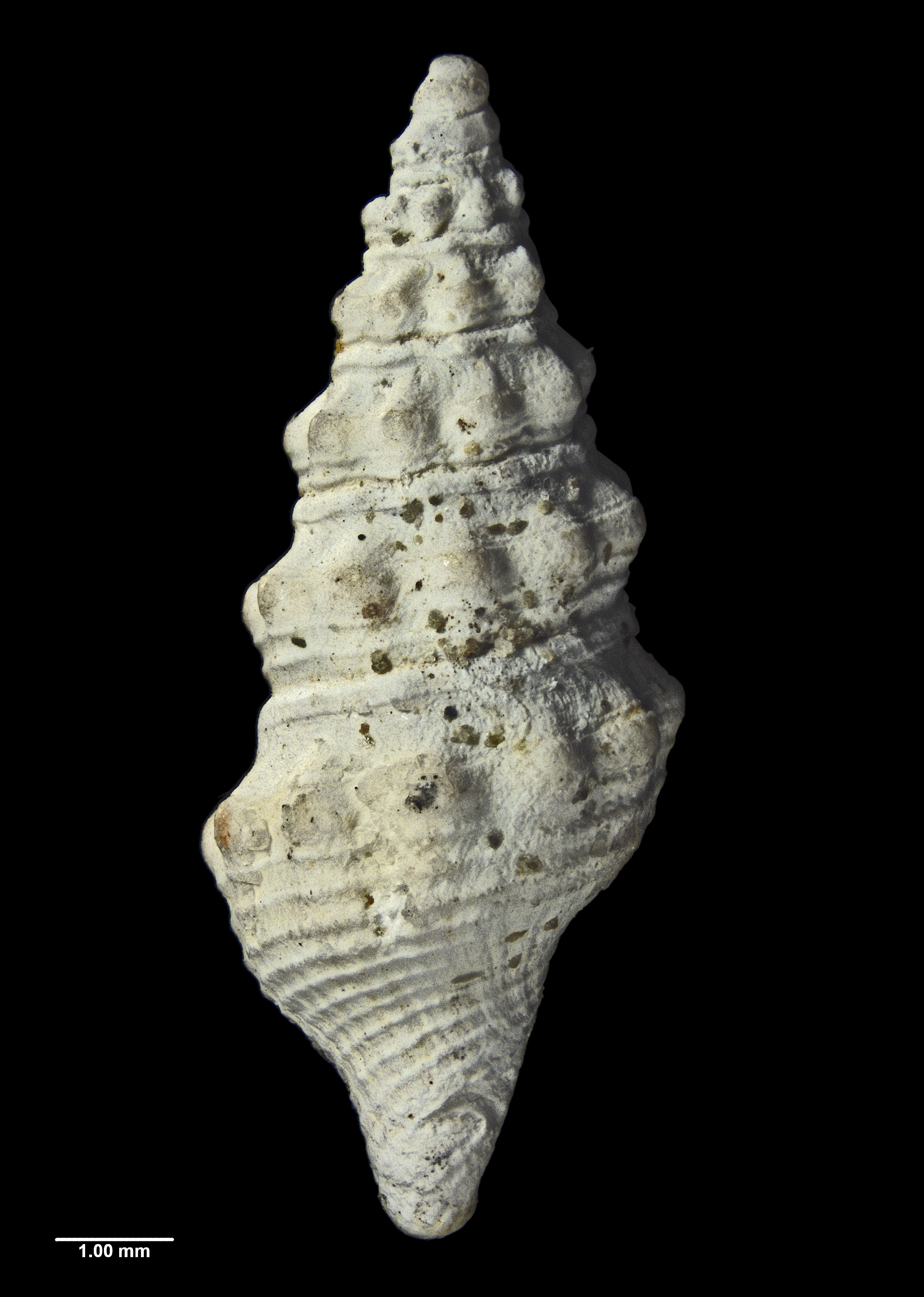
Reverse view of holotype

The species has a moderately sized shell, with 7.5 whorls and a protoconch of 1.5 whorls. The whorls are strongly angulate and blut at the middle. The holotype of the species measures 10 mm (0.39 in) in height and 4.1 mm (0.16 in) in diameter.

== Taxonomy ==
The species was first described by A.W.B. Powell in 1942. The holotype was collected from Target Gully, Glen Creek, Oamaru, Otago at an unknown date prior to 1943, and is held by the Auckland War Memorial Museum.

== Distribution ==
This extinct marine species occurs in early Miocene strata of the Mount Harris Formation near Oamaru, Otago, New Zealand.
