= Mauidrillia browni =

Scientific classification
- Kingdom: Animalia
- Phylum: Mollusca
- Class: Gastropoda
- Subclass: Caenogastropoda
- Order: Neogastropoda
- Superfamily: Conoidea
- Family: Horaiclavidae
- Genus: Mauidrillia
- Species: M. browni

Binomial name
- Mauidrillia browni Marwick, 1943

Extinct species of gastropod

Mauidrillia browni is an extinct species of sea snail, a marine gastropod mollusk in the family Horaiclavidae.

== Description ==
The length of the shell attains 7 mm, its diameter is 3 mm.

== Distribution ==
This extinct marine species was found in Tertiary strata of the North Otago, New Zealand.
