= Mauidrillia felina =

Scientific classification
- Kingdom: Animalia
- Phylum: Mollusca
- Class: Gastropoda
- Subclass: Caenogastropoda
- Order: Neogastropoda
- Superfamily: Conoidea
- Family: Horaiclavidae
- Genus: Mauidrillia
- Species: M. felina

Binomial name
- Mauidrillia felina Kilburn, 1988

Species of gastropod

Mauidrillia felina is a species of sea snail, a marine gastropod mollusk in the family Horaiclavidae.

== Description ==
The length of the shell attains 12.8 mm (0.50 in), its diameter 4.6 mm (0.18 in).

== Distribution ==
This marine species occurs on the continental slope of western Transkei, South Africa, at depths between 300–446 m.
