= Mauidrillia incerta =

Scientific classification
- Kingdom: Animalia
- Phylum: Mollusca
- Class: Gastropoda
- Subclass: Caenogastropoda
- Order: Neogastropoda
- Superfamily: Conoidea
- Family: Horaiclavidae
- Genus: Mauidrillia
- Species: M. incerta

Binomial name
- Mauidrillia incerta Beu, 1970

Extinct species of gastropod

Mauidrillia incerta is an extinct species of sea snail, a marine gastropod mollusk in the family Horaiclavidae.

== Distribution ==
This extinct marine species is endemic to New Zealand
