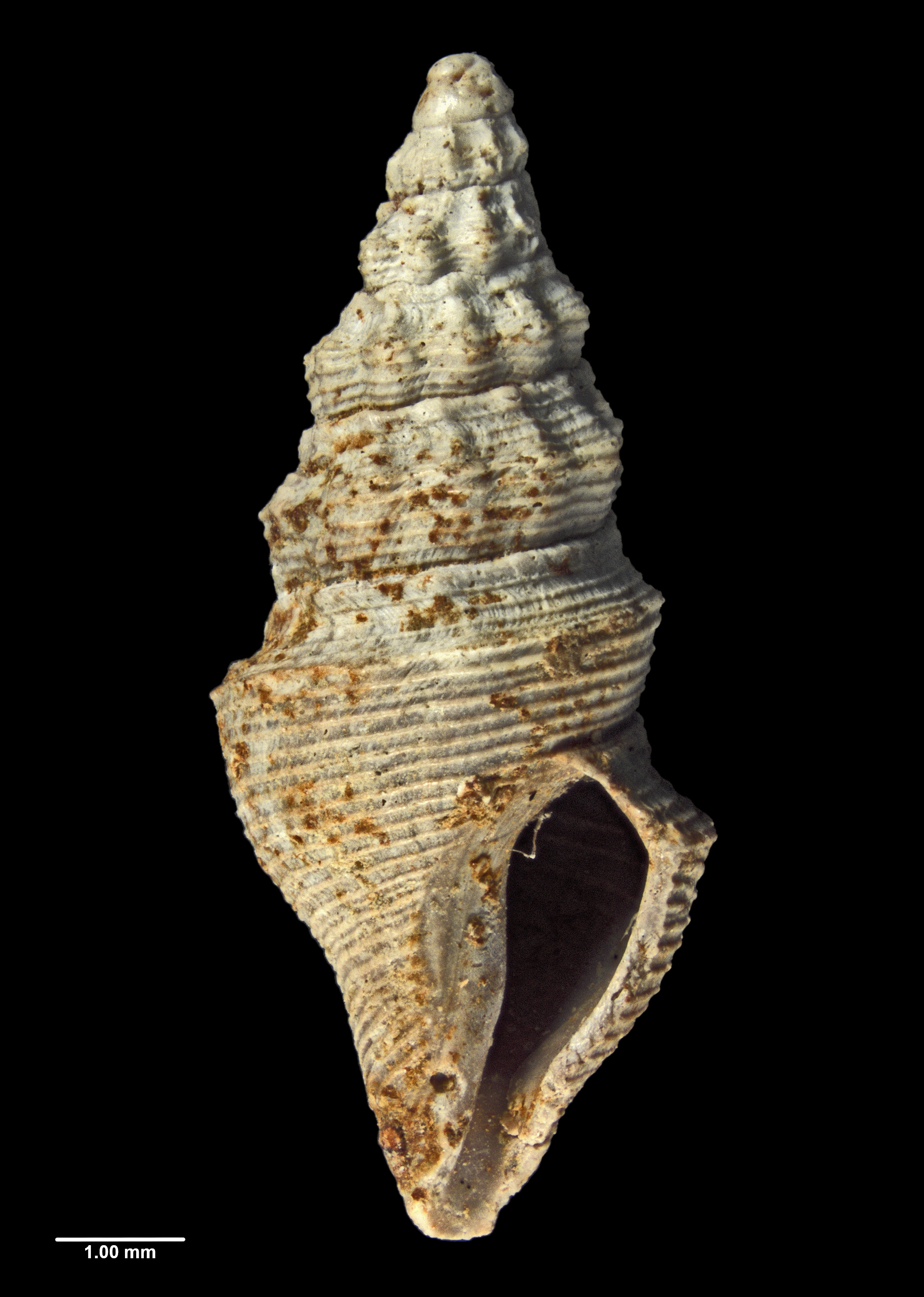
- Holotype from Auckland War Memorial Museum

Scientific classification
- Kingdom: Animalia
- Phylum: Mollusca
- Class: Gastropoda
- Subclass: Caenogastropoda
- Order: Neogastropoda
- Family: Horaiclavidae
- Genus: Mauidrillia
- Species: †M. torquayensis

Binomial name
- †Mauidrillia torquayensis A. W. B. Powell, 1944

= Mauidrillia torquayensis =

Mauidrillia torquayensis Temporal range: late Oligocene

Extinct species of gastropod

Mauidrillia torquayensis is an extinct species of sea snail, a marine gastropod mollusc in the family Horaiclavidae. Fossils of the species date to the late Oligocene strata of the Port Phillip Basin of Victoria, Australia.

== Description ==
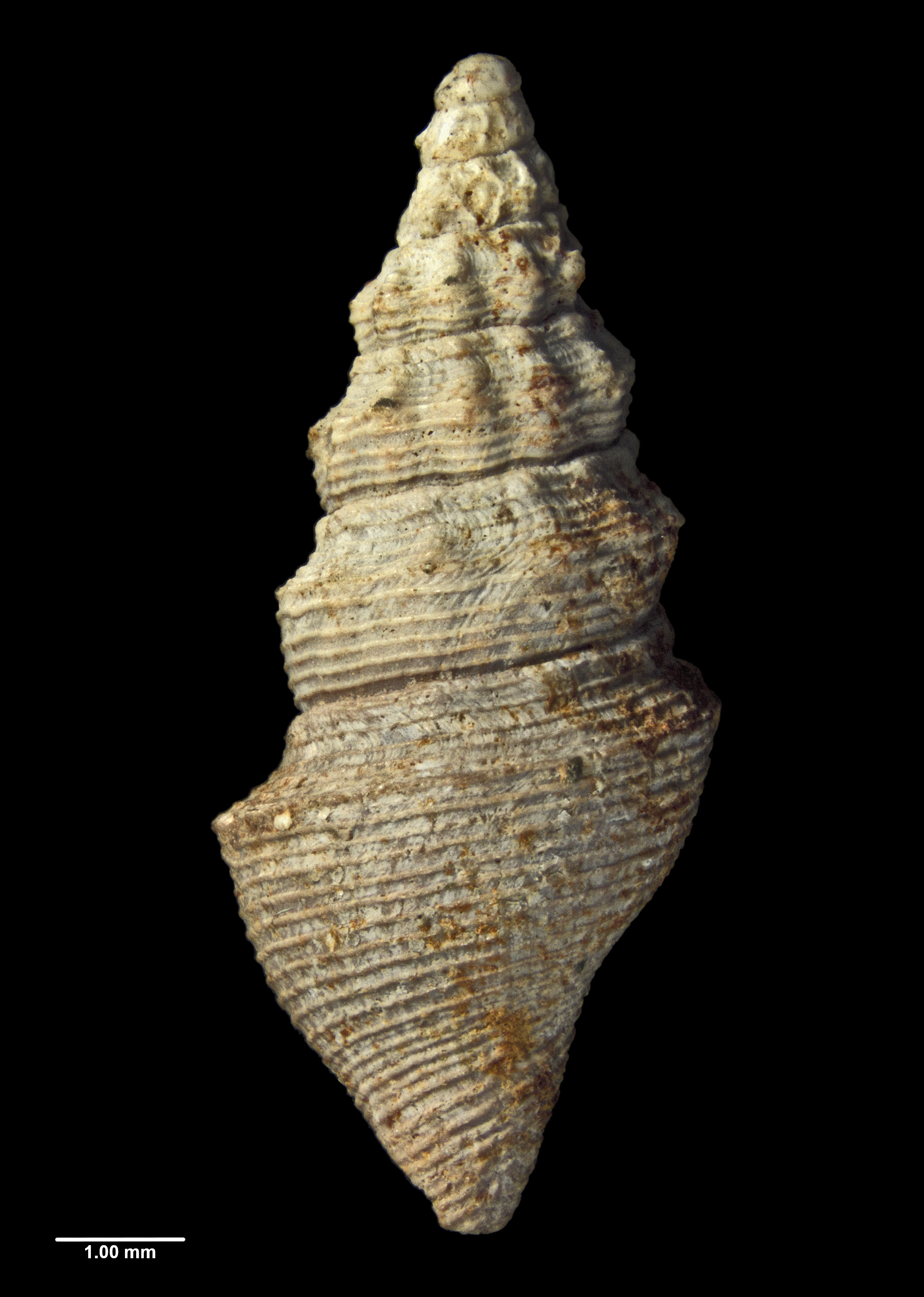
Reverse view of holotype

In the original description, Powell described the species as follows:

Species superficially similar to aldingensis, but more likely derived from pullulascens, from which it differs in being broader, with a stronger, more persistent peripheral angulation and strong axial knobs. Subsutural fold indistinctly defined on early whorls only. Four fine spirals on shoulder. Five to six stronger cords from angle to lower suture on spire-whorls, about 25 on body-whorl, base, and anterior end. Interspaces slightly more than width of spirals. Axials strong at periphery, but becoming obsolete before reaching either suture.

The holotype of the species measures 9.1 mm (0.36 in) in height and 3.9 mm (0.15 in) in diameter.

== Taxonomy ==
The species was first described by A.W.B. Powell in 1944. The holotype was collected from Torquay, Victoria, Australia at an unknown date prior to 1945, and is held by the Auckland War Memorial Museum. In 1981, D. C. Long theorised that the late Eocene species M. aldingensis was ancestral to M. torquayensis.

== Distribution ==
This extinct marine species occurs in late Oligocene strata of the Port Phillip Basin of Victoria, including the Jan Juc Formation.
