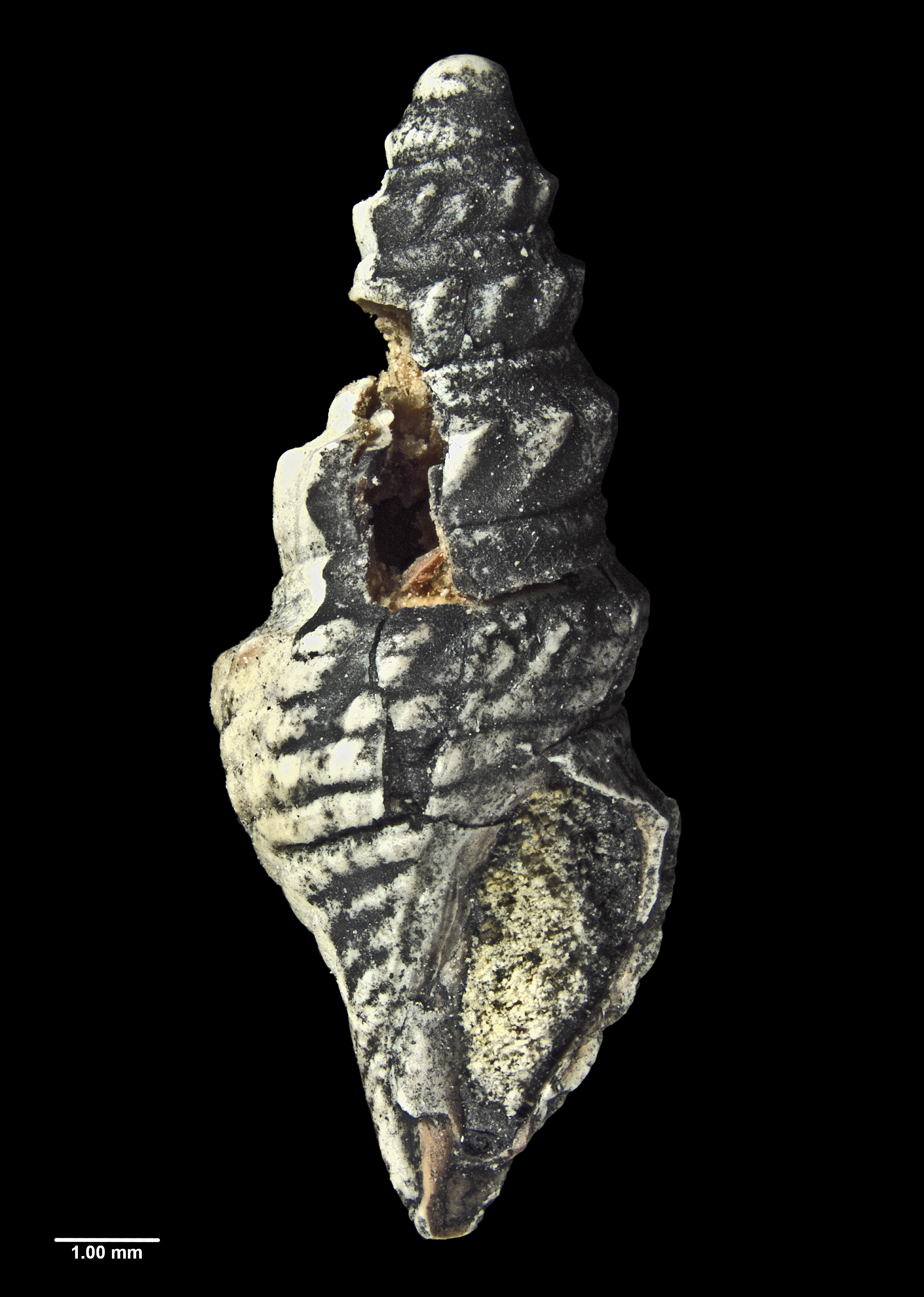
- Holotype from Auckland War Memorial Museum

Scientific classification
- Kingdom: Animalia
- Phylum: Mollusca
- Class: Gastropoda
- Subclass: Caenogastropoda
- Order: Neogastropoda
- Family: Horaiclavidae
- Genus: Mauidrillia
- Species: †M. secta

Binomial name
- †Mauidrillia secta A. W. B. Powell, 1944

Synonyms
- Mauidrillia secta secta A. W. B. Powell, 1944

= Mauidrillia secta =

Mauidrillia secta Temporal range: late Eocene

Extinct species of gastropod

Mauidrillia secta is an extinct species of sea snail, a marine gastropod mollusc in the family Horaiclavidae. Fossils of the species date to the late Eocene strata of the St Vincent Basin of South Australia, and the Otway Basin of South Australia and Victoria.

== Description ==
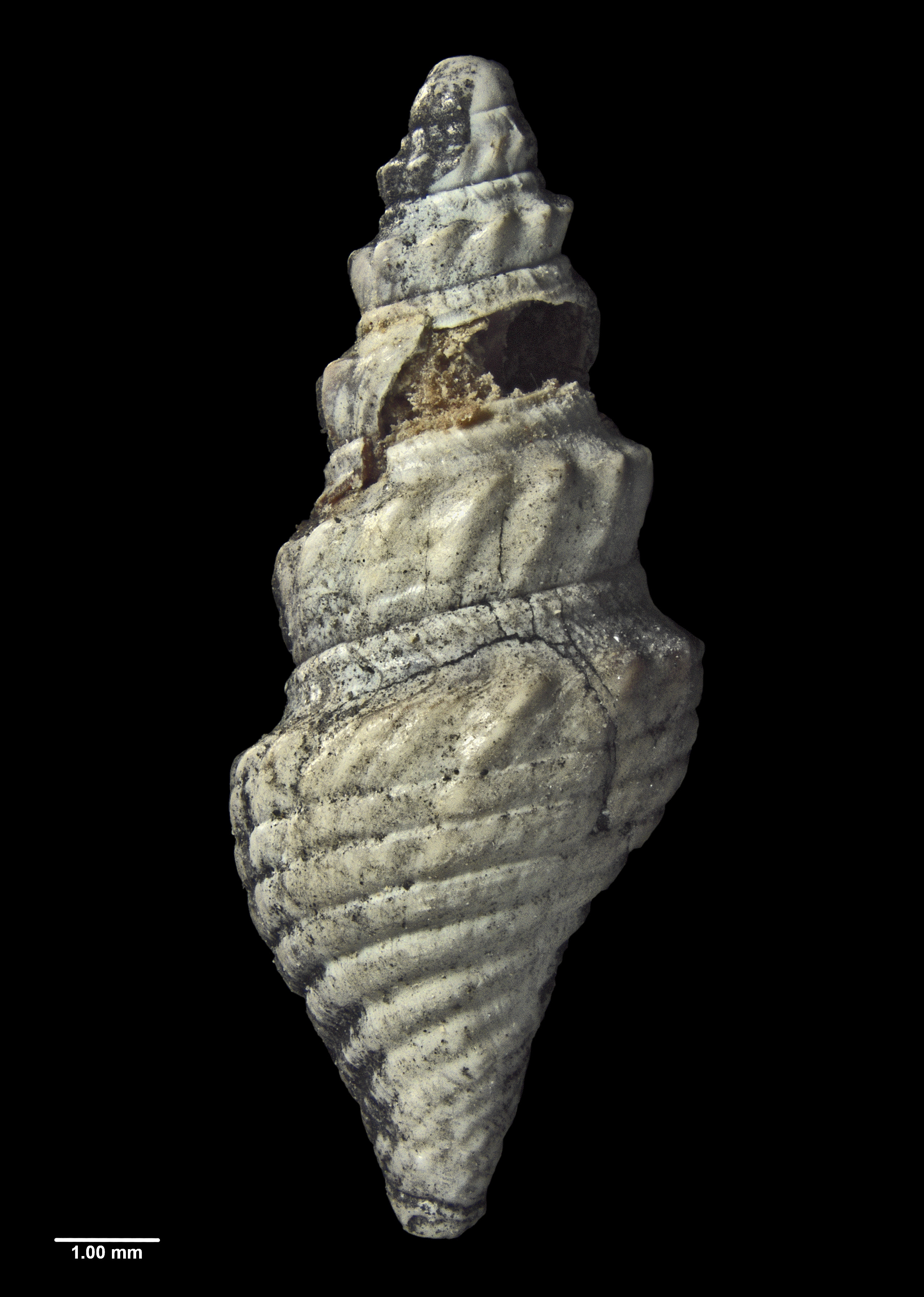
Reverse view of holotype

In the original description, Powell described the species as follows:

Differing from all other species in the deeply incised lines which cut the surface into broad, rounded, spiral folds. Two or three linear grooves below periphery on spire-whorls, nine on body-whorl and base, plus five linear-spaced weaker cords on the anterior end. Subsutural fold moderate. Shoulder without spiral sculpture. Axials very oblique, planed off above, 13 per whorl, strongest at periphery, where they are sharply tubercular, but becoming obsolete before reaching lower suture.

The holotype of the species measures 12 mm (0.47 in) in height and 4.5 mm (0.18 in) in diameter. The shell has a rounded protoconch of 1.5 whorls, with a slightly flattened and deviated tip.

== Taxonomy ==
The species was first described by A.W.B. Powell in 1944. The holotype was collected from the Blanche Point Formation in Aldinga, South Australia at an unknown date prior to 1945, and is held by the Auckland War Memorial Museum. In 1981, D. C. Long described a subspecies, M. secta otwayensis, which has since been raised to species level.

== Distribution ==
This extinct marine species occurs in late Eocene strata of the St Vincent Basin and Otway Basin, including the Blanche Point Formation and Browns Creek Formation of South Australia and Victoria.
