= Mauidrillia acuta =

Scientific classification
- Kingdom: Animalia
- Phylum: Mollusca
- Class: Gastropoda
- Subclass: Caenogastropoda
- Order: Neogastropoda
- Superfamily: Conoidea
- Family: Horaiclavidae
- Genus: Mauidrillia
- Species: M. acuta

Binomial name
- Mauidrillia acuta (Marwick, 1928)

Synonyms
- † Inquisitor acutus J.Marwick, 1928

Extinct species of gastropod

Mauidrillia acuta is an extinct species of sea snail, a marine gastropod mollusk in the family Horaiclavidae.

== Description ==
The length of the shell attains 12.5 mm, its diameter is 4 mm. This marine genus ranges across the Indo-West Pacific, encompassing the Red Sea and East Africa to Japan, as well as along the coast of Australia.

== Distribution ==
This extinct marine species was found in Tertiary strata of the Chatham Islands and Pitt Island, New Zealand.
