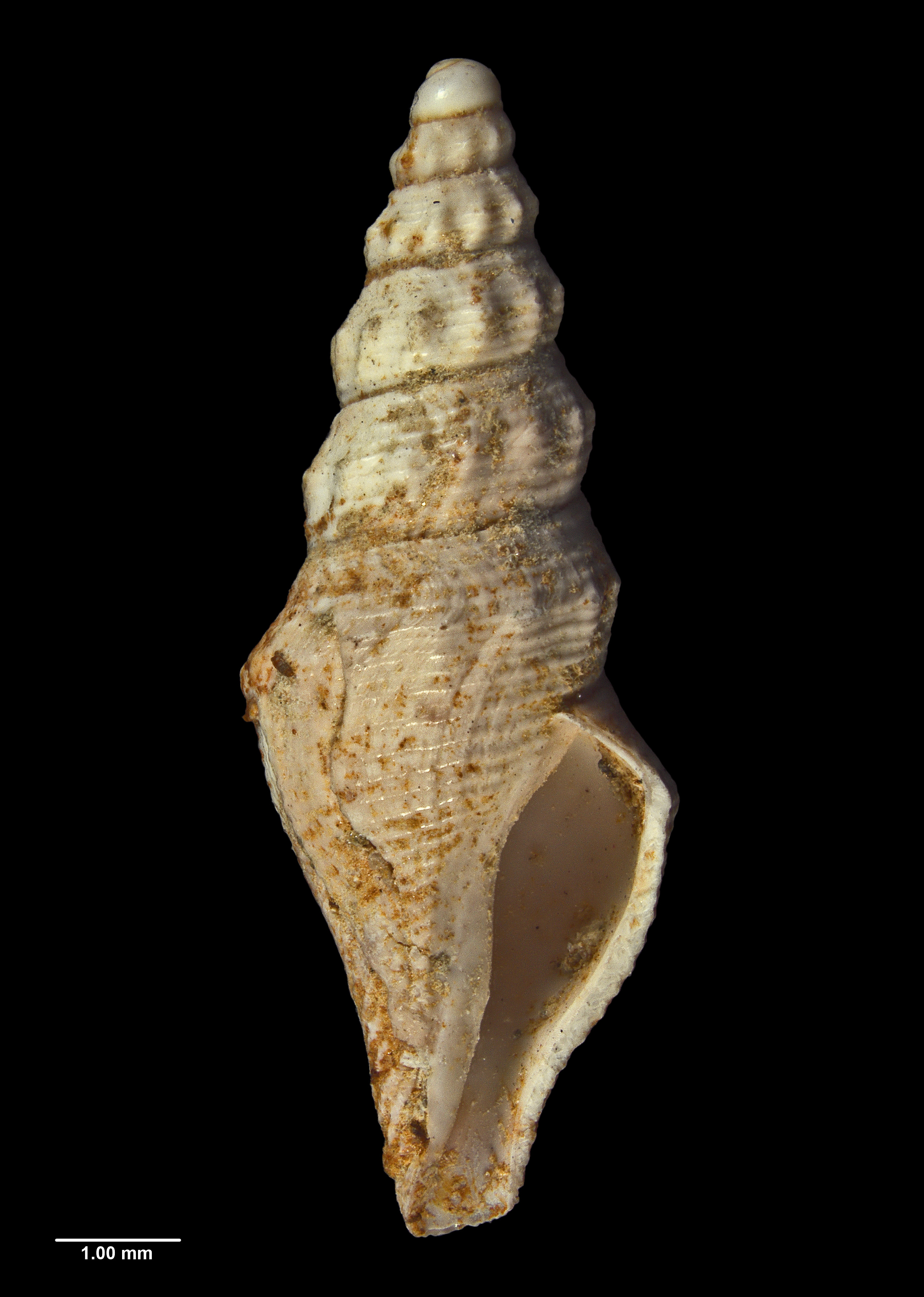
- Holotype from Auckland War Memorial Museum

Scientific classification
- Kingdom: Animalia
- Phylum: Mollusca
- Class: Gastropoda
- Subclass: Caenogastropoda
- Order: Neogastropoda
- Family: Horaiclavidae
- Genus: Mauidrillia
- Species: †M. angustata

Binomial name
- †Mauidrillia angustata A. W. B. Powell, 1942

= Mauidrillia angustata =

Mauidrillia angustata Temporal range: early Miocene

Extinct species of gastropod

Mauidrillia angustata is an extinct species of sea snail, a marine gastropod mollusc in the family Horaiclavidae. Fossils of the species date to the early Miocene strata of the Mount Harris Formation at Pukeuri, Otago, New Zealand.

== Description ==
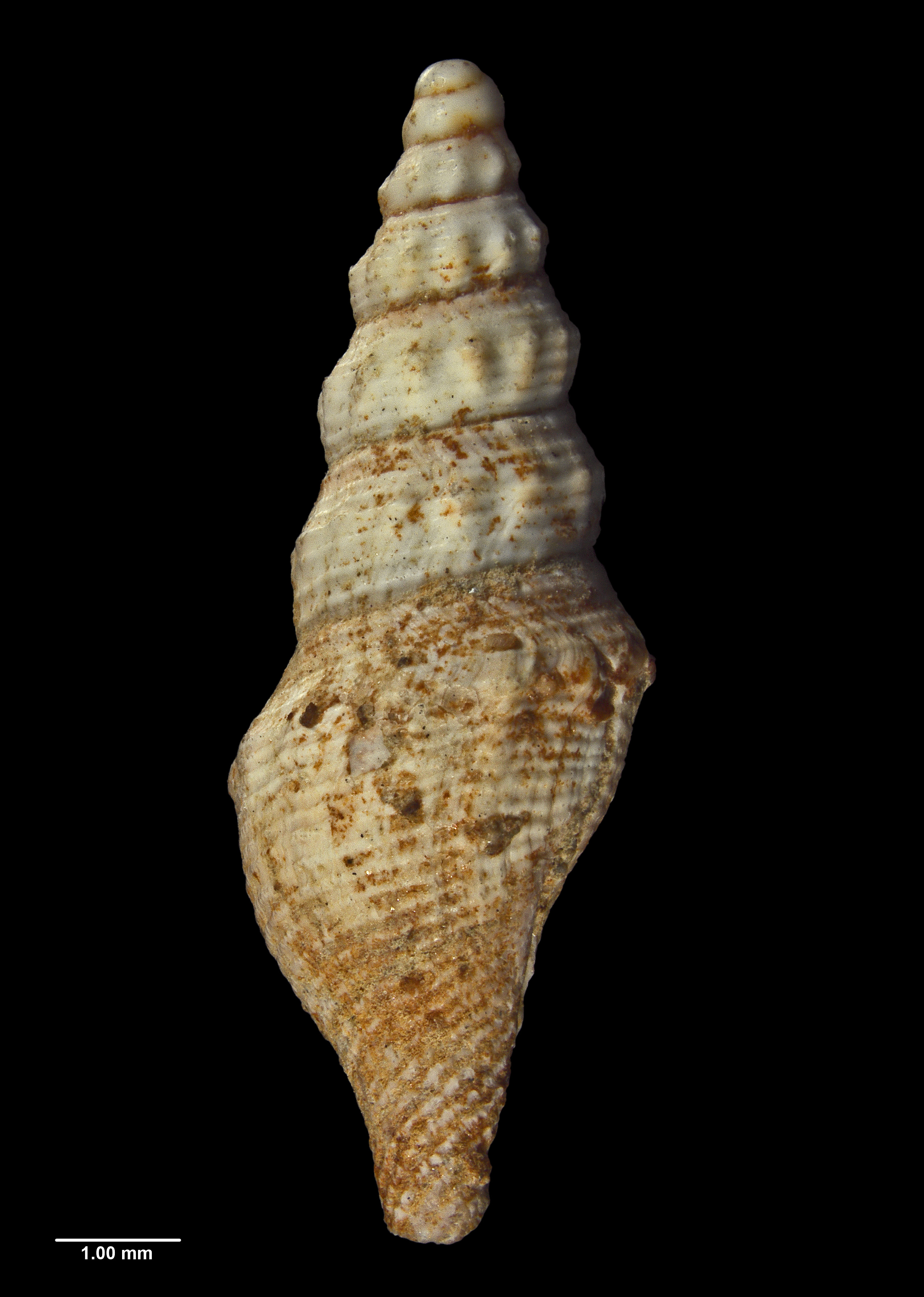
Reverse view of holotype

The species has a small, narrowly fusiform shell with a spire 1.5 times the height of the combined length of the aperture and canal. The shell has 6.5 whorls, including a protoconch of 1.5 whorls. The species has moderately strong and oblique axials (14 on penultimare) which are thickened and laterally compressed at the periphery. The axials do not reach the shell' sutures. The shell has seven primary cords on the spire whorls, a narrow aperture, and a long canal. The spire sculpture is strong on either side of the periphery.

The holotype of the species measures 9.5 mm (0.37 in) in height and 3.4 mm (0.13 in) in diameter.

== Taxonomy ==
The species was first described by A.W.B. Powell in 1942. The holotype was collected from Pukeuri, Otago, New Zealand at an unknown date prior to 1943, and is held by the Auckland War Memorial Museum.

== Distribution ==
This extinct marine species occurs in early Miocene strata of the Mount Harris Formation at Pukeuri, Otago, New Zealand.
