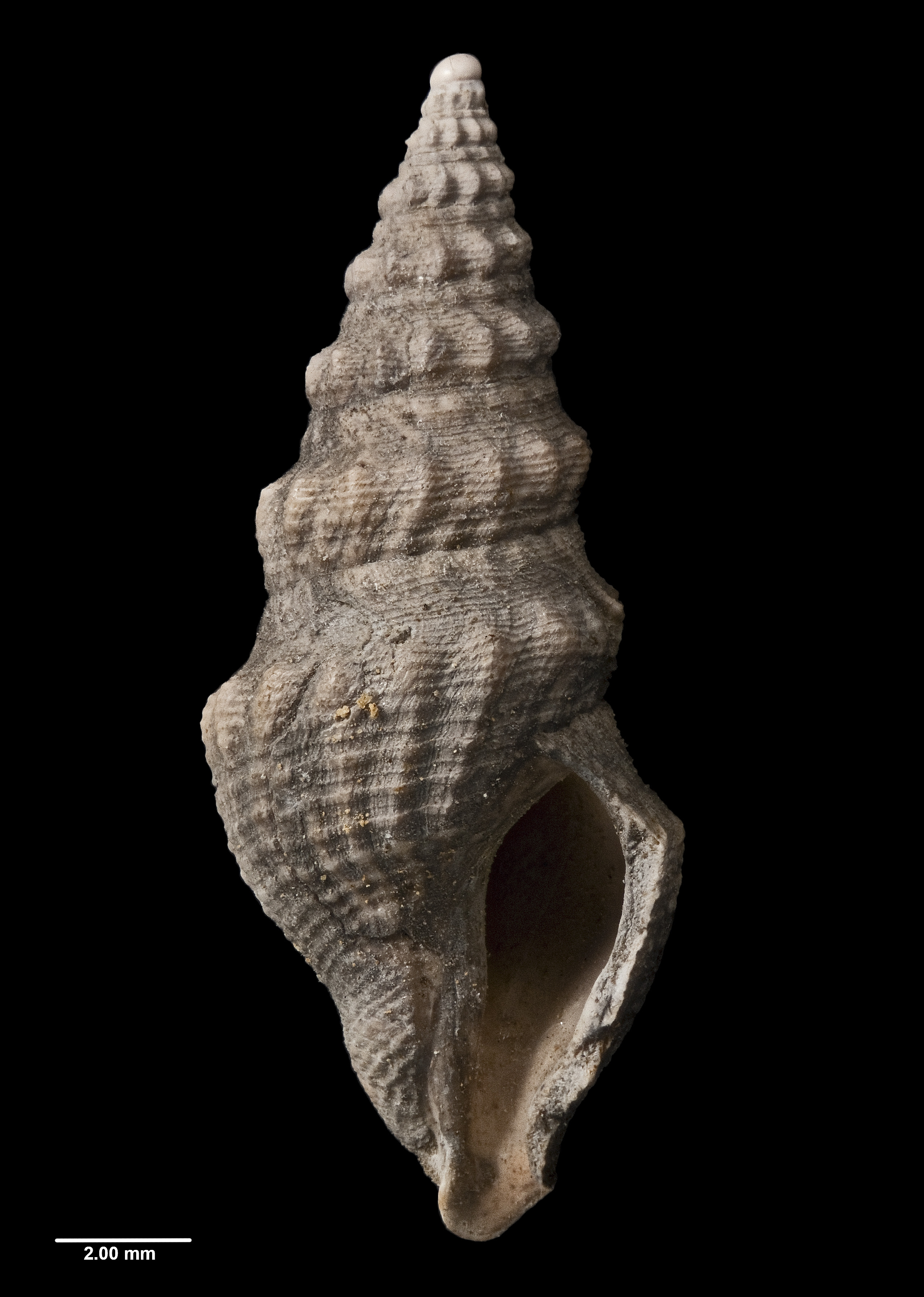
- Holotype from Auckland War Memorial Museum

Scientific classification
- Kingdom: Animalia
- Phylum: Mollusca
- Class: Gastropoda
- Subclass: Caenogastropoda
- Order: Neogastropoda
- Family: Horaiclavidae
- Genus: Mauidrillia
- Species: †M. intumescens

Binomial name
- †Mauidrillia intumescens A. W. B. Powell, 1944

= Mauidrillia intumescens =

Mauidrillia intumescens Temporal range: late Miocene

Extinct species of gastropod

Mauidrillia intumescens is an extinct species of sea snail, a marine gastropod mollusc in the family Horaiclavidae. Fossils of the species date to the late Miocene, and have been found in strata of the Gippsland Basin of Victoria, Australia.

== Description ==
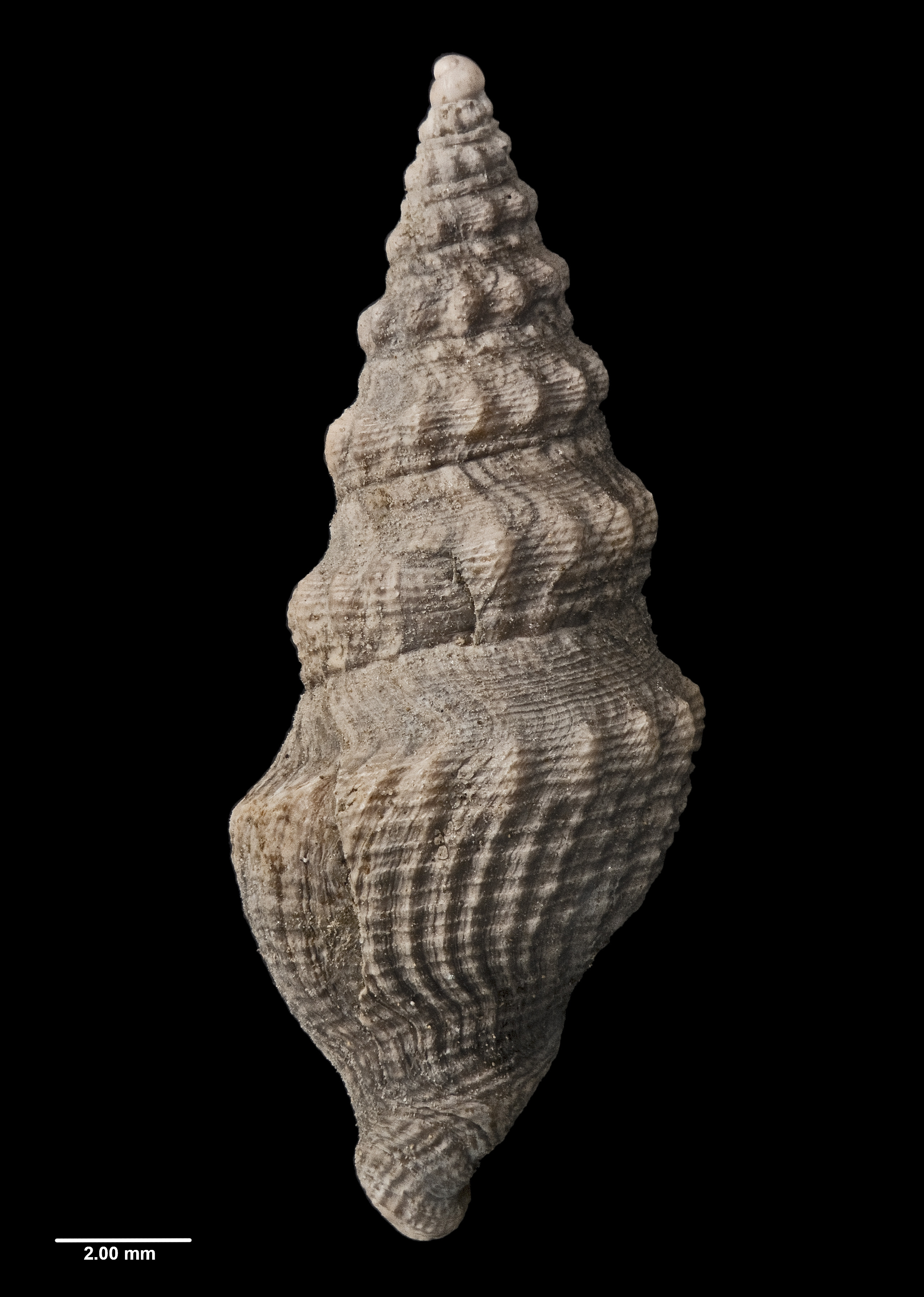
Reverse view of holotype

In the original description, Powell described the species as follows:

Shell large for genus; distinguished from all other Australian members by the broad, heavy peripheral fold. A moderately broad subsutural fold, on the early spire-whorls only. Surface of spire crowded with spiral threads, 3 on subsutural fold, 4-8 on broadly concave shoulder, 5-6 on peripheral fold, and 1 or 2 stronger cords below it. Six primary cords on base, plus intermediate threads and 8 closely spaced threads on the anterior end. Axials strongly nodulose on the peripheral fold, 14 per whorl; weakly nodulose on the subsutural fold, but elsewhere they are narrow and weak.

The holotype of the species measures 18 mm (0.71 in) in height and 7.5 mm (0.30 in) in diameter.

== Taxonomy ==
The species was first described by A.W.B. Powell in 1944. The holotype was collected from the Jemmys Point Formation in the Gippsland Lakes, Victoria at an unknown date prior to 1937, and is held by the Auckland War Memorial Museum.

== Distribution ==
This extinct marine species occurs in late Miocene strata of the Gippsland Basin of Victoria, including the Jemmys Point Formation.
