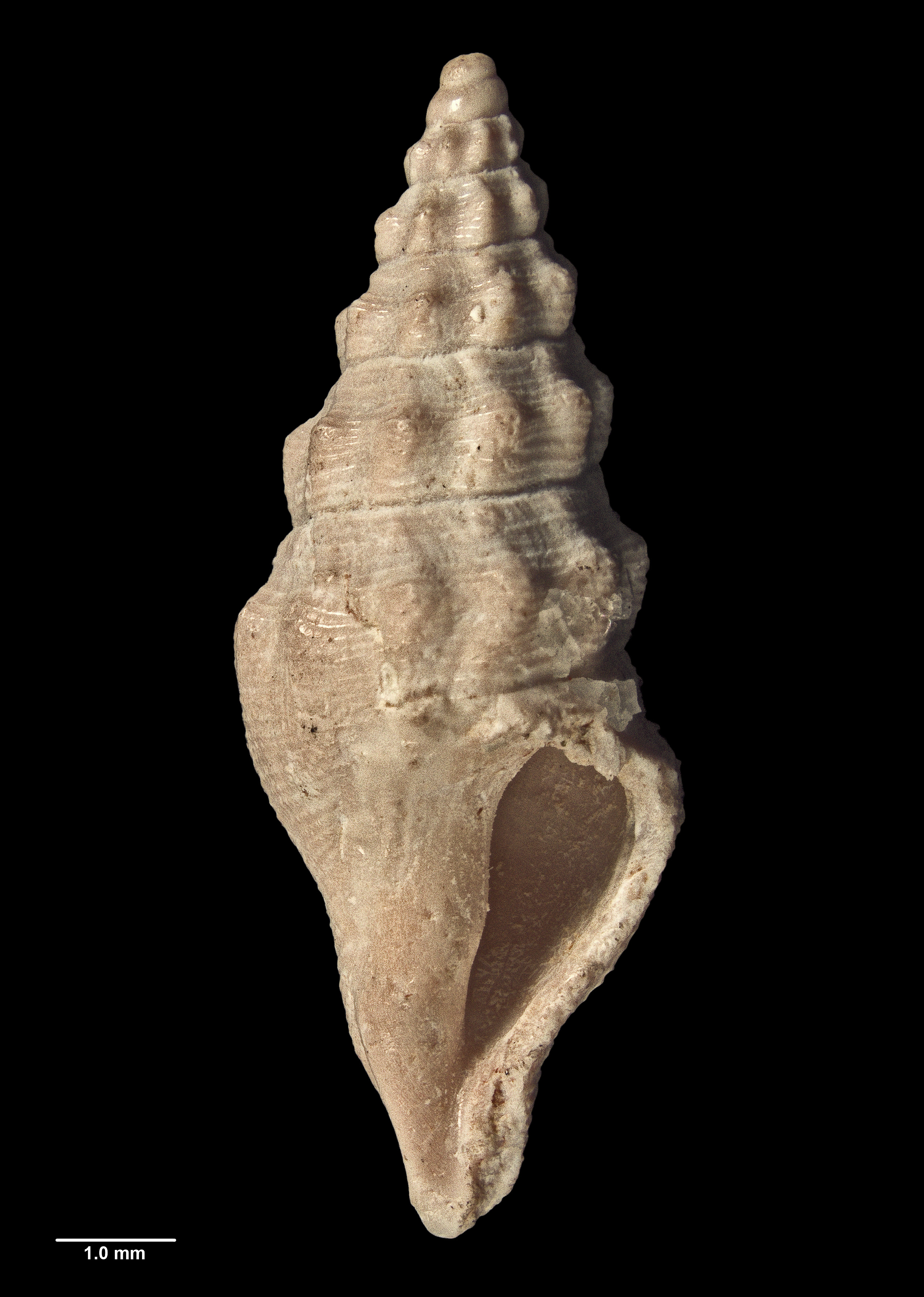
- Holotype from Auckland War Memorial Museum

Scientific classification
- Kingdom: Animalia
- Phylum: Mollusca
- Class: Gastropoda
- Subclass: Caenogastropoda
- Order: Neogastropoda
- Family: Horaiclavidae
- Genus: Mauidrillia
- Species: †M. inaequalis

Binomial name
- †Mauidrillia inaequalis A. W. B. Powell, 1942

= Mauidrillia inaequalis =

Mauidrillia inaequalis Temporal range: late Oligocene–early Miocene

Extinct species of gastropod

Mauidrillia inaequalis is an extinct species of sea snail, a marine gastropod mollusc in the family Horaiclavidae. Fossils of the species date to the late Oligocene and early Miocene, and are found in South Canterbury and Otago, New Zealand.

== Description ==
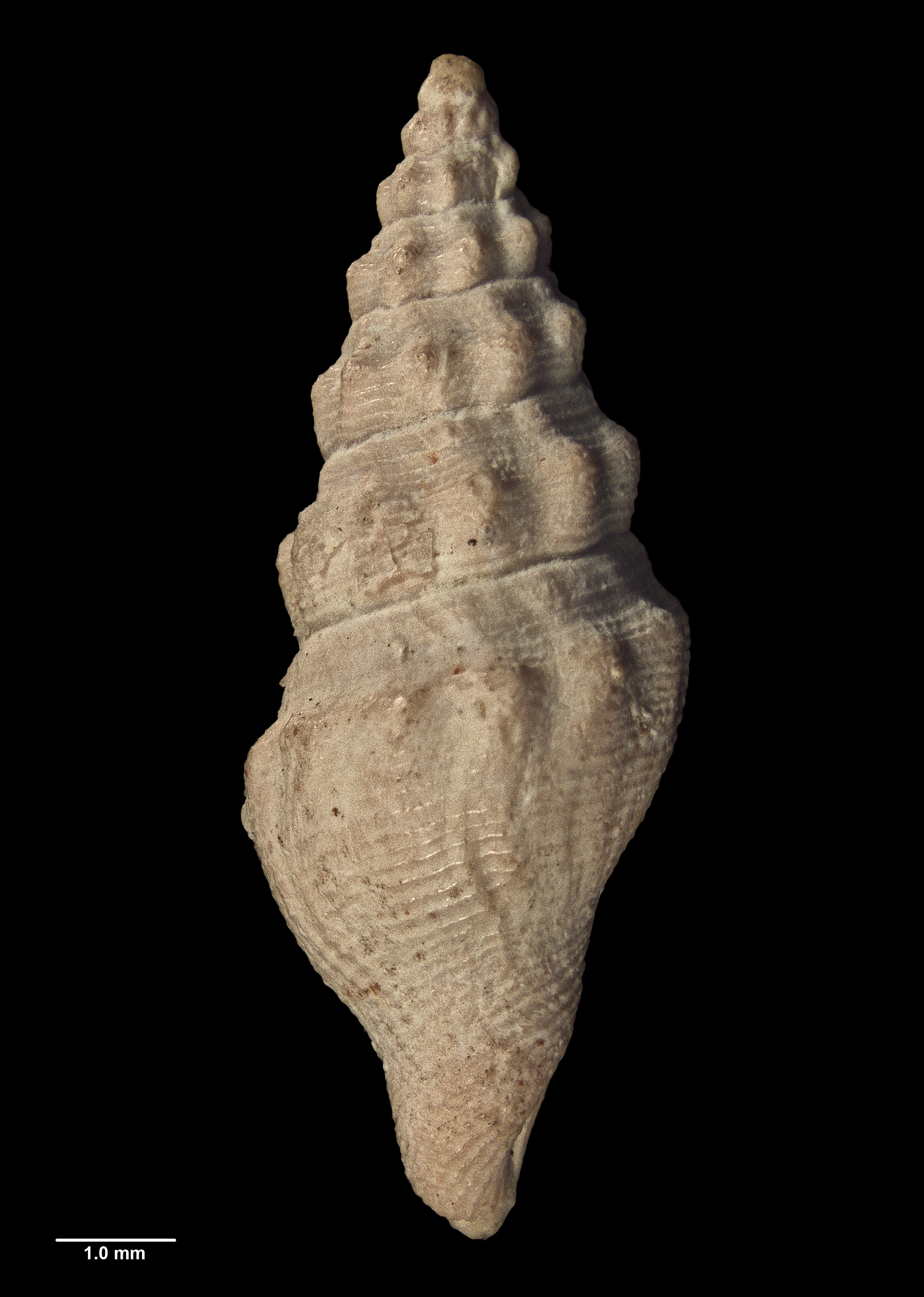
Reverse view of holotype

The species has a moderately sized shell, with 7.5 whorls and a protoconch of 1.5 inflated whorls. The whorls are strongly angulate just above the middle, and the shells are deeply concave at the shoulder. The shells have broad axials and are crossed by fine, close spaced spirals. The holotype of the species measures 10 mm (0.39 in) in height and 4 mm (0.16 in) in diameter.

== Taxonomy ==
The species was first described by A.W.B. Powell in 1942. The holotype was collected from Otiake, Waitaki Valley, Otago at an unknown date prior to 1943, and is held by the Auckland War Memorial Museum.

== Distribution ==
This extinct marine species occurs in late Oligocene and early Miocene strata of Blue Cliffs and the Pareora River of South Canterbury, and the Waitaki Valley of Otago, New Zealand.
