= Mauidrillia cinctuta =

Scientific classification
- Kingdom: Animalia
- Phylum: Mollusca
- Class: Gastropoda
- Subclass: Caenogastropoda
- Order: Neogastropoda
- Superfamily: Conoidea
- Family: Horaiclavidae
- Genus: Mauidrillia
- Species: M. cinctuta

Binomial name
- Mauidrillia cinctuta (Marwick, 1929)

Synonyms
- Austrodrillia cinctuta Marwick, 1929

Extinct species of gastropod

Mauidrillia cinctuta is an extinct species of sea snail, a marine gastropod mollusk in the family Horaiclavidae.

== Description ==
The length of the shell attains 7 mm, its diameter 3 mm. Teleoconch of about 5 whorls, near middle on spire. Axial sculpture of narrow, opisthocline costae with much border interspace. Costae weaker on last whorl on some shells. Costae weaker on whorl of most scarcely extending onto base reduced to short on some shell. 12-15 costae on penultimate whorl. Inner lip thinly callused, no parietal callus pad. Outer lip thin, with shallow U-shaped Anal sulcus.

== Distribution ==
This extinct marine species was found in Tertiary strata of the Chatton shellbed, New Zealand.
