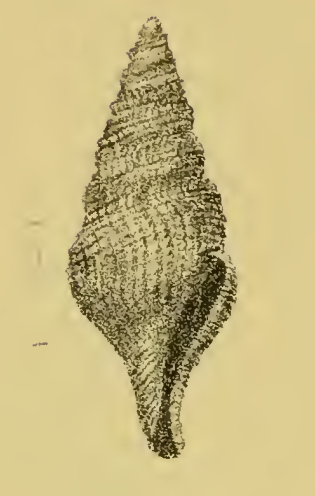
- Shell of Mauidrillia consutilis (holotype)

Scientific classification
- Kingdom: Animalia
- Phylum: Mollusca
- Class: Gastropoda
- Subclass: Caenogastropoda
- Order: Neogastropoda
- Superfamily: Conoidea
- Family: Horaiclavidae
- Genus: Mauidrillia
- Species: M. consutilis

Binomial name
- Mauidrillia consutilis (Tenison Woods, 1880)

Synonyms
- † Asthenotoma consutilis Cossmann, 1896; † Filodrillia turrita Chapple,1941; † 'Pleurotoma consutilis' Tenison Woods, 1880 (original combination)

= Mauidrillia consutilis =

Species of gastropod

Mauidrillia consutilis is an extinct species of sea snail, a marine gastropod mollusk in the family Horaiclavidae.

== Description ==
Dimensions: length 12 mm; breadth 5 mm; length of the aperture 5 mm.

(Original description) Though this shell is destitute of any striking ornamentation, it is easily distinguished from the species already described. It is very neatly, obliquely cancellate, the transverse and longitudinal lines being very neat, distinct, equal, and sufficiently distant to leave very definite rhomboidal spaces. The whorls are keeled in the middle, about which there is a rather broad, flat, shallow groove which corresponds to the sinus. It has a fine line in the centre, and is closely transversely marked with elegant curved ribs. The aperture is wide, the outer lip is much produced in the middle, and the sinus is very conspicuous, wide and deep. The siphonal canal is twisted. The neat distant cancellation, and the fine lines on the groove give the surface an appearance of open thread work, hence the name.

The protoconch is composed of 1½ smooth, shining whorls, the anterior portion of which is obtusely keeled medially. This keel develops into a strong feature in the brephic and neanic stages, but on approaching the adult is not so clearly marked. The shell is small and fusiform. The whorls are obliquely cancellate. The transverse and longitudinal lines are regularly spaced. The aperture is broad. The outer lip is much produced towards the middle. The sinus is broad, deep, and some distance from the suture. The columella is distinctly twisted. The anterior is canal short.

== Distribution ==
Fossils of this extinct species were found in Middle Miocene strata in Victoria, Australia.
