= Epidirona =

Scientific classification
- Kingdom: Animalia
- Phylum: Mollusca
- Class: Gastropoda
- Subclass: Caenogastropoda
- Order: Neogastropoda
- Family: Horaiclavidae
- Genus: Epidirona; Iredale, 1931

Genus of gastropods

Epidirona is a genus of sea snails, marine gastropod mollusks in the family Horaiclavidae.

This genus is considered by WoRMS as a synonym of Epideira Hedley, 1918

== Species ==
Species within the genus Epidirona include:

- Epidirona beachportensis (Cotton & Godfrey, 1938): synonym of Epideira beachportensis Cotton & Godfrey, 1938
- Epidirona candida Laseron, 1954: synonym of Epideira candida (Laseron, 1954)
- Epidirona carinata Laseron, 1954: synonym of Epideira carinata (Laseron, 1954)
- Epidirona costifera Laseron, 1954: synonym of Epideira tuberculata (Laseron, 1954)
- Epidirona flindersi (Cotton & Godfrey, 1938): synonym of Epideira flindersi Cotton & Godfrey, 1938
- Epidirona hedleyi Iredale, 1931: synonym of Epideira hedleyi (Iredale, 1931)
- Epidirona molleri Laseron, 1954: synonym of Epideira carinata (Laseron, 1954)
- Epidirona multiseriata (Smith E. A., 1877): synonym of Epideira multiseriata (E. A. Smith, 1877)
- Epidirona nodulosa Laseron, 1954: synonym of Epideira nodulosa (Laseron, 1954)
- Epidirona perksi (Verco, 1896): synonym of Epideira perksi (Verco, 1896)
- Epidirona philipineri (Tenison-Woods, 1877): synonym of Epideira philipineri (Tenison Woods, 1877)
- Epidirona quoyi (Desmoulins, 1842): synonym of Epideira quoyi (Desmoulins, 1842)
- Epidirona schoutanica (May, 1911): synonym of Epideira schoutanica (May, 1911)
- Epidirona torquata (Hedley, 1922): synonym of Epideira torquata Hedley, 1922
- Epidirona tuberculata Laseron, 1954: synonym of Epideira tuberculata (Laseron, 1954)
- Epidirona xanthophaes (Watson, 1886): synonym of Epidirella xanthophaes (R. B. Watson, 1886)
