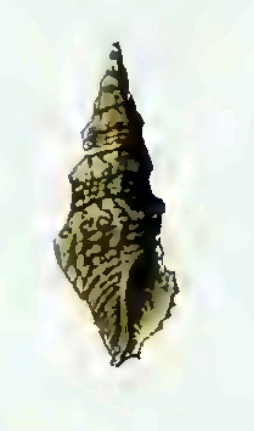
- Drawing of a shell of Paradrillia consimilis

Scientific classification
- Kingdom: Animalia
- Phylum: Mollusca
- Class: Gastropoda
- Subclass: Caenogastropoda
- Order: Neogastropoda
- Superfamily: Conoidea
- Family: Horaiclavidae
- Genus: Paradrillia; Makiyama, 1940

Type species
- Drillia dainichiensis Yokoyama, 1923

Species
- See text

Synonyms
- Clavatula (Alticlavatula) MacNeil, 1961; Clavatula (Paradrillia) Makiyama, 1940 (original rank); Paradrillia (Coronacomitas) Shuto, 1983 · alternative representation

= Paradrillia =

Genus of gastropods

Paradrillia is a genus of sea snails, marine gastropod mollusks in the family Horaiclavidae.

Coronacomitas was originally proposed by T. Shuto in 1983 as a subgenus of Paradrillia for Paradrillia gemmata. It showed some resemblance to Pleurotoma multiseriata Smith, 1877, synonym of Epidirona multiseriata (E. A. Smith, 1877). It differs however by the position of the anal sinus which is situated on the shoulder slope and not on the shoulder itself.

== Species ==
Species within the genus Paradrillia include:

- Paradrillia agalma (Smith E. A., 1906)
- Paradrillia alluaudi (Dautzenberg, 1932)
- † Paradrillia astuta (Yokoyama, 1928)
- † Paradrillia astutoida (Shuto, 1961)
- † Paradrillia boehmi (K. Martin, 1914)
- Paradrillia celebensis (Schepman, 1913)
- † Paradrillia cocoa C.-H. Hu & X.-F. Lee, 1991
- Paradrillia consimilis (Smith E. A., 1879)
- Paradrillia dainichiensis (Yokoyama, 1923)
- Paradrillia darnleyensis Shuto, 1983
- † Paradrillia ermelingi (K. Martin, 1884)
- Paradrillia felix (Kuroda, Habe & Oyama, 1971)
- Paradrillia fugata (E.A. Smith, 1895)
- Paradrillia gemmata Shuto, 1983
- † Paradrillia himea Makiyama, 1927
- Paradrillia inconstans (Smith E. A., 1875)
- † Paradrillia kakegawensis Makiyama, 1927
- Paradrillia lithoria (Melvill & Standen, 1903)
- Paradrillia melvilli Powell, 1969
- Paradrillia minoensis Shuto, 1961
- Paradrillia nannodes (Sturany, 1900) (synonym: Pleurotoma (Surcula) nannodes Sturany, 1900)
- Paradrillia nivalioides (Yokoyama, M., 1920)
- Paradrillia pachyspira Harzhauser, Raven & Landau, 2018
- Paradrillia patruelis (Smith E. A., 1875)
- † Paradrillia rougeyroni (Souverbie, 1874)
- Paradrillia sagamiana Okutani, 1964
- Paradrillia sultana (Thiele, 1925)
- Paradrillia taiwanensis Nomura, 1935

Species brought into synonymy

- Paradrillia (Paradrillia) coxi (Angas, 1867): synonym of Vexitomina coxi (Angas, 1867)
- Paradrillia agnewi Tenison-Woods, 1879: synonym of Vexitomina coxi (Angas, 1867)
- Paradrillia asamusiensis Nomura & Zinbo, 1940: synonym of Paradrillia inconstans (Smith, 1875)
- Paradrillia celebensis (Schepman, M.M., 1913): synonym of Benthomangelia celebensis (Schepman, 1913)
- Paradrillia convexiuscula T. Shuto, 1961: synonym of Paradrillia consimilis (E. A. Smith, 1879)
- Paradrillia dainitiensis Makiyama, 1922: synonym of Paradrillia consimilis (Smith, 1879)
- Paradrillia gaylordae Preston, 1905: synonym of Paradrillia inconstans prunulum (Melvill & Standen, 1901)
- Paradrillia pilazona Laseron, 1954 : synonym of Vexitomina torquata Laseron, 1954
- Paradrillia reticulata Kuroda, 1953: synonym of Iwaoa reticulata Kuroda, 1953
