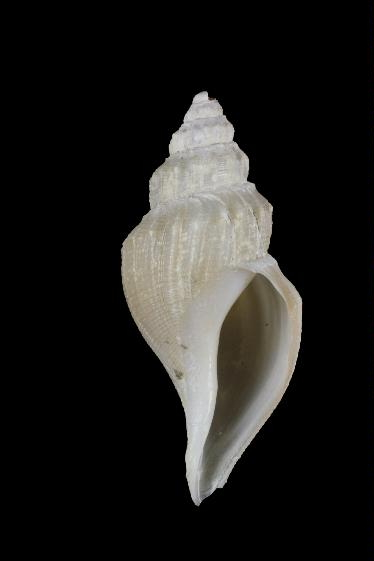
- Shell of Marshallena nierstraszi (specimen at MNHN, Paris)

Scientific classification
- Kingdom: Animalia
- Phylum: Mollusca
- Class: Gastropoda
- Subclass: Caenogastropoda
- Order: Neogastropoda
- Superfamily: Conoidea
- Family: Marshallenidae
- Genus: Marshallena
- Species: M. nierstraszi

Binomial name
- Marshallena nierstraszi (Schepman, 1913)

Synonyms
- Surcula nierstraszi Schepman, 1913

= Marshallena nierstraszi =

Species of gastropod

Marshallena nierstraszi is a species of sea snail, a marine gastropod mollusk in the family Marshallenidae.

== Description ==
The length of the shell attains 25¼ mm, its diameter 12¼ mm.

(Original description) The thin shell is broadly fusiform, with a rather short spire. It is light greyish-white. The protoconch is wanting. The six remaining whorls, of which the upper one is likewise eroded, are angularly convex, and slightly excavated below the deep suture. The sculpture consists of slightly oblique, narrow ribs, arcuated in the excavation, 15 in number in the penultimate whorl, with blunt tubercles about the median part of upper whorls and on the shoulder of the body whorl, with beads at their upper extremities. Just below the suture, the shell is covered with fine growth striae and spiral lirae, these lirations being faint in the excavation, stronger and crowded in lower part of whorls, more remote on the siphonal canal; the body whorl attenuated below, passing without marked limit in the rather short canal. The aperture is oval, slightly angular above, with a rather narrow siphonal canal below. The peristome is broken, according to growth striae with a very shallow sinus below the suture. The columellar margin is concave above, directed to the left along the siphonal canal, with a thin layer of enamel. The operculum is thin, corneous, with a terminal nucleus at the left side. The radula shows 2 rows of teeth, in about 12 transverse rows, each tooth with a rather sharp point and a deep sinus at its basal margin, separating .2 unequal digitations.

== Distribution ==
This marine species occurs off Celebes and in the Arafura Sea at a depth of 1788 meters, and in the China Sea at a depth between 958 meters and 988 meters.
