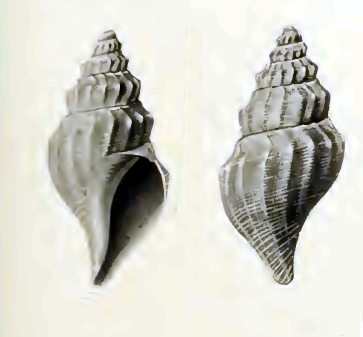
- Original image of a shell of Marshallena nierstraszi

Scientific classification
- Kingdom: Animalia
- Phylum: Mollusca
- Class: Gastropoda
- Subclass: Caenogastropoda
- Order: Neogastropoda
- Superfamily: Conoidea
- Family: Marshallenidae
- Genus: Marshallena; Allan, 1926

Type species
- † Daphnella neozelanica Suter, 1917

Species
- See text

Synonyms
- Sugitanitoma Kuroda, 1959

= Marshallena =

Genus of gastropods

Marshallena is a genus of sea snails, marine gastropod mollusks in the family Marshallenidae.

R.S. Allen (1927) did not specify a type species for this genus. H.J. Finlay (1927) selected Belophos incertus Marshall, 1919, which was amended by Powell (1966 + 1969) to † Daphnella neozelanica Suter, 1917.

Before 2018 this genus belonged to the family Horaiclavidae.

== Species ==
Species within the genus Marshallena include:

- † Marshallena curtata (Marwick, 1926)
- Marshallena diomedea Powell, 1969
- † Marshallena neozelanica (Suter, 1917)
- Marshallena nierstraszi (Schepman, 1913)
- Marshallena philippinarum (Watson, 1882)

Species brought into synonymy

- † Marshallena anomala Powell, 1942: synonym of † Zeatoma anomala (Powell, 1942)
- † Marshallena austrotomoides Powell, 1931: synonym of † Zeatoma austrotomoides (Powell, 1931)
- † Marshallena carinaria Powell, 1935: synonym of † Gymnobela carinaria (Powell, 1935)
- † Marshallena celsa Marwick, 1931: synonym of † Zeatoma celsa (Marwick, 1931) (original combination)
- † Marshallena decens Marwick, 1931: synonym of † Zeatoma decens (Marwick, 1931) (original combination)
- Marshallena gracilispira Powell, 1969: synonym of Benthomangelia gracilispira (Powell, 1969)
- † Marshallena impar Powell, 1942: synonym of † Zeatoma impar (Powell, 1942)
