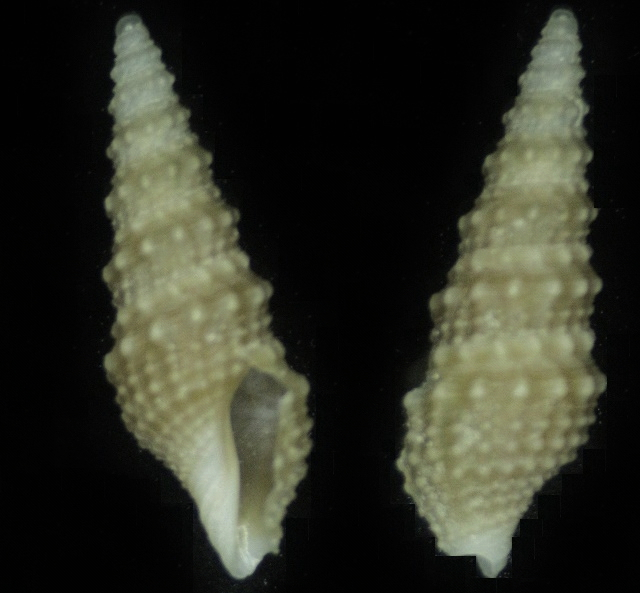
- Image of a shell of Paradrillia rougeyroni

Scientific classification
- Kingdom: Animalia
- Phylum: Mollusca
- Class: Gastropoda
- Subclass: Caenogastropoda
- Order: Neogastropoda
- Superfamily: Conoidea
- Family: Horaiclavidae
- Genus: Paradrillia
- Species: P. rougeyroni

Binomial name
- Paradrillia rougeyroni (Souverbie, S.M. in Souverbie, S.M. & R.P. Montrouzier, 1874)

= Paradrillia rougeyroni =

Species of gastropod

Paradrillia rougeyroni is a species of sea snail, a marine gastropod mollusk in the family Horaiclavidae.

There is a remarkable similarity with Drillia barkliensis H. Adams, 1869 (synonym: Drillia rougeyroni (Souverbie in Souverbie & Montrouzier, 1874) )

== Description ==
The length of the shell attains 30 mm.

== Distribution ==
This marine species occurs in the Pacific Ocean off the Loyalty Islands.
