= Vexitomina radulaeformis =

Scientific classification
- Kingdom: Animalia
- Phylum: Mollusca
- Class: Gastropoda
- Subclass: Caenogastropoda
- Order: Neogastropoda
- Superfamily: Conoidea
- Family: Horaiclavidae
- Genus: Vexitomina
- Species: V. radulaeformis

Binomial name
- Vexitomina radulaeformis (Weinkauff & Kobelt, 1876)

Synonyms
- Inquisitor radulaeformis (Weinkauff, 1876); Pleurotoma (Surgula) radulaeformis (sic)Weinkauff & Kobelt, 1876

Species of gastropod

Vexitomina radulaeformis is a species of sea snail, a marine gastropod mollusk in the family Horaiclavidae.

== Description ==
Charles Hedley (1922) was of the opinion that this species is unknown to Australian conchologists; apparently it resembles Vexitomina metcalfei (Angas, 1867). The type is probably in the Godefffoy Museum, Hamburg. He described it as Inquisitor radulaeformis.

== Distribution ==
This marine species is endemic to Australia and occurs in the Bass Strait, Tasmania.
