= Vexitomina sinensis =

Scientific classification
- Kingdom: Animalia
- Phylum: Mollusca
- Class: Gastropoda
- Subclass: Caenogastropoda
- Order: Neogastropoda
- Superfamily: Conoidea
- Family: Horaiclavidae
- Genus: Vexitomina
- Species: V. sinensis

Binomial name
- Vexitomina sinensis Ma, 1989

Species of gastropod

Vexitomina sinensis is a species of sea snail, a marine gastropod mollusk in the family Horaiclavidae.

Distinguished from Vexitomina chinensis Ma, 1989, synonym of synonym of Paradrillia patruelis (E. A. Smith, 1875)

== Distribution ==
This species occurs in the Yellow Sea.
