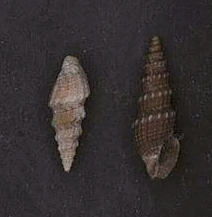
- Shells of Vexitomina metcalfei

Scientific classification
- Kingdom: Animalia
- Phylum: Mollusca
- Class: Gastropoda
- Subclass: Caenogastropoda
- Order: Neogastropoda
- Superfamily: Conoidea
- Family: Horaiclavidae
- Genus: Vexitomina; Powell, 1942

Type species
- Drillia metcalfei Angas, 1867

= Vexitomina =

Genus of gastropods

Vexitomina is a genus of sea snails, marine gastropod mollusks in the family Horaiclavidae.

== Species ==
Species within the genus Vexitomina include:

- Vexitomina coriorudis (Hedley, 1922)
- Vexitomina coxi (Angas, 1867)
- Vexitomina metcalfei (Angas, 1867)
- Vexitomina radulaeformis (Weinkauff & Kobelt, 1876)
- Vexitomina regia (Reeve, 1842)
- Vexitomina sinensis Ma, 1989
- Vexitomina suavis (Smith E. A., 1888)
- Vexitomina torquata Laseron, 1954

Species brought into synonymy

- Vexitomina chinensis Ma, 1989: synonym of Paradrillia patruelis (E. A. Smith, 1875)
- Vexitomina garrardi Laseron, 1954: synonym of Vexitomina coxi (Angas, 1867)
- Vexitomina optabilis (Murdoch & Suter, 1906): synonym of Awateria optabilis (R. Murdoch & Suter, 1906)
- Vexitomina pilazona Laseron, 1954: synonym of Vexitomina torquata Laseron, 1954
