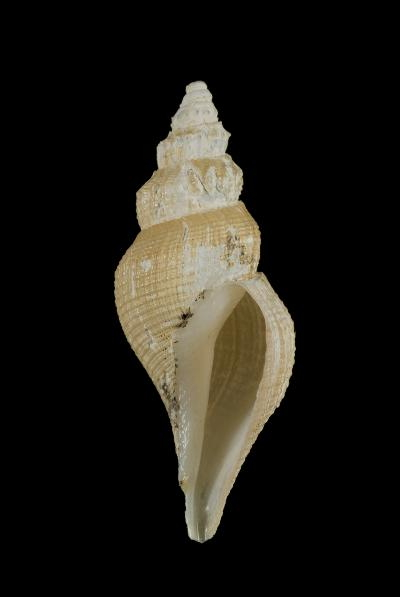
- Shell of Marshallena philippinarum (specimen at MNHN, Paris)

Scientific classification
- Kingdom: Animalia
- Phylum: Mollusca
- Class: Gastropoda
- Subclass: Caenogastropoda
- Order: Neogastropoda
- Superfamily: Conoidea
- Family: Marshallenidae
- Genus: Marshallena
- Species: M. philippinarum

Binomial name
- Marshallena philippinarum (Watson, 1882)

Synonyms
- Fusus philippinarum Watson, 1882; Pleurotoma nereis E.A. Smith, 1906; Trophon floresianus Schepman, 1913; Sugitania reticulata Kuroda, 1958; Sugitanitoma reticulata Kuroda, 1959

= Marshallena philippinarum =

Species of gastropod

Marshallena philippinarum is a species of sea snail, a marine gastropod mollusk in the family Marshallenidae.

== Description ==
The length of the shell attains 25 mm.

The thin, white shell has a fusiform shape. It shows a moderately long spire and siphonal canal. It contains about 7 whorls. The protoconch and subsequent whorls are eroded, remaining 4 whorls convex, angular, separated by a deep suture. The sculpture consists of axial ribs, rather remote on the upper whorls, 19 in number on penultimate whorl, nearly disappearing on the body whorl and numerous, raised striae or growth lines. These are crossed by spirals, of which a subsutural one is beaded, as well as those on the angle of keel; above this latter are a few faint spirals and more numerous ones on lower part of whorls, 4 on penultimate, about 20 on the body whorl and siphonal canal, faintly beaded or crenuliferous at the points of intercrossing. The aperture is elongately oval, with a rather blunt angle above, ending below in a rather narrow siphonal canal. The peristome is broken. The columellar margin is slightly concave above, straight below and along the siphonal canal, with a thin layer of enamel.

== Distribution ==
This marine species occurs in the Flores Sea (at a depth of 794 m) and off Northeast Sumatra at depths between 750 and 794 m.
