= Marshallena curtata =

Scientific classification
- Kingdom: Animalia
- Phylum: Mollusca
- Class: Gastropoda
- Subclass: Caenogastropoda
- Order: Neogastropoda
- Superfamily: Conoidea
- Family: Marshallenidae
- Genus: Marshallena
- Species: M. curtata

Binomial name
- Marshallena curtata (Marwick, 1926)

Synonyms
- † Turricula curtata Marwick, 1926

Extinct species of gastropod

Marshallena curtata is an extinct species of sea snail, a marine gastropod mollusk in the family Marshallenidae.

== Distribution ==
This extinct marine species was found in the middle Tongaporutuan beds of Bell's Creek, New Zealand.
