= Marshallena diomedea =

Scientific classification
- Kingdom: Animalia
- Phylum: Mollusca
- Class: Gastropoda
- Subclass: Caenogastropoda
- Order: Neogastropoda
- Superfamily: Conoidea
- Family: Marshallenidae
- Genus: Marshallena
- Species: M. diomedea

Binomial name
- Marshallena diomedea Powell, 1969

Species of gastropod

Marshallena diomedea is a species of sea snail, a marine gastropod mollusc in the family Marshallenidae.

== Distribution ==
This marine species occurs off Kalimantan, Borneo at depths between 558–567 m.
