= Inquisitor radula =

- Shell of Inquisitor radula (specimen at Naturalis Biodiversity Center)

Scientific classification
- Kingdom: Animalia
- Phylum: Mollusca
- Class: Gastropoda
- Subclass: Caenogastropoda
- Order: Neogastropoda
- Superfamily: Conoidea
- Family: Pseudomelatomidae
- Genus: Inquisitor
- Species: I. radula

Binomial name
- Inquisitor radula (Hinds, 1843)

Synonyms
- Drillia radula (Hinds, 1843); Inquisitor versicolor Weinkauff & Kobelt, 1876; Pleurotoma inconstans Smith, E.A. 1875; Pleurotoma radula Hinds, 1843 (original combination); Pleurotoma (Surcula) radula (Hinds, 1843); Pleurotoma rudulaeformis Weinkauff, H.C. 1876; Pleurotoma (Surgula (sic)) versicolor Weinkauff, H.C. 1876; Turris radula (Hinds, 1843)

Species of gastropod

Inquisitor radula is a species of sea snail, a marine gastropod mollusk in the family Pseudomelatomidae.

== Description ==
It is closely related to Vexitomina metcalfei (Angas, 1867), but is shorter, stouter, more solid, and more harshly sculptured.

== Distribution ==
This marine species is endemic to Australia and occurs off Queensland and Japan.
