= Marshallena neozelanica =

Scientific classification
- Kingdom: Animalia
- Phylum: Mollusca
- Class: Gastropoda
- Subclass: Caenogastropoda
- Order: Neogastropoda
- Superfamily: Conoidea
- Family: Marshallenidae
- Genus: Marshallena
- Species: M. neozelanica

Binomial name
- Marshallena neozelanica (Suter, 1917)

Synonyms
- Daphenlla neozelanica Suter, 1915; Daphnella (Raphitoma) neozelanica Suter 1917

Species of gastropod

Marshallena neozelanica is a species of sea snail, a marine gastropod mollusk in the family Marshallenidae.

== Description ==
The length of the fusiform shell varies between 18 mm and 25 mm.

== Distribution ==
This marine species was found as a fossil off Ninety Mile Beach, North Island, New Zealand but live specimens can still be found in the Indo-Pacific at mid-shelf to bathyal habitats
