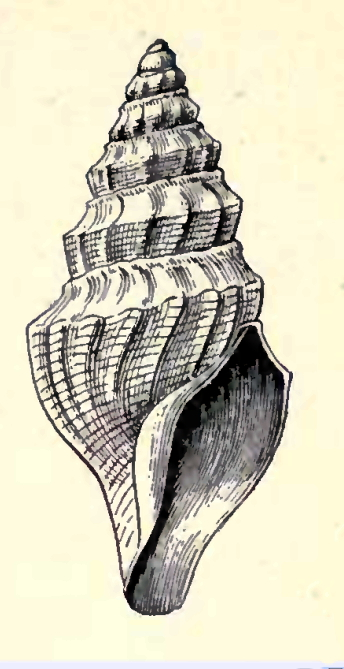
- Image of a shell of Benthomangelia antonia

Scientific classification
- Kingdom: Animalia
- Phylum: Mollusca
- Class: Gastropoda
- Subclass: Caenogastropoda
- Order: Neogastropoda
- Superfamily: Conoidea
- Family: Mangeliidae
- Genus: Benthomangelia
- Species: B. antonia

Binomial name
- Benthomangelia antonia (Dall, 1881)

Synonyms
- Daphnella antonia (Dall, 1881); Mangelia antonia (Dall, 1881); Mangelia innocens Thiele, 1925; Mangilia antonia (Dall, 1881); Pleurotoma (Mangilia) antonia Dall, 1881 (original combination); Pleurotoma incincta Watson, 1881; Pleurotoma mericiacum Locard, 1897; Pleurotomella diomedae Verrill, 1884; Pleurotomella diomedeae Verrill & S. Smith [in Verrill], 1884

= Benthomangelia antonia =

Species of gastropod

Benthomangelia antonia is a species of sea snail, a marine gastropod mollusk in the family Mangeliidae.

== Description ==
The length of the shell varies between 8 mm and 15 mm.

(Original description) The shell is six-whorled, with a length of 5.75 mm. The protoconch is clear brown, with three whorls, on most of which there are scalar ridges which are much more closely and regularly set than in Benthomangelia bandella, and do not resemble lamellae. There is only a trace of an antesutural revolving rib in the earlier whorls which vanishes entirely in the later ones, and with it, of course, the tendency to raised points of sculpture. Though its place is marked by a white opacity in the otherwise rather translucent shell. There are thirteen longitudinal ribs on the body whorl, which extend on to the anterior fourth of the whorl instead of vanishing, and are more evident and sharper where they cross the band. While the revolving ribs are less regular and extend partially over the notch-band, which is thus rendered much less conspicuous than in B. bandella. The notch is also less marked and the spire has a stouter aspect.

== Distribution ==
This species occurs in European waters, the Northwest Atlantic Ocean (from New Jersey, United States, to Southern Brazil), off the Azores in the Gulf of Guinea and in the Gulf of Mexico.
