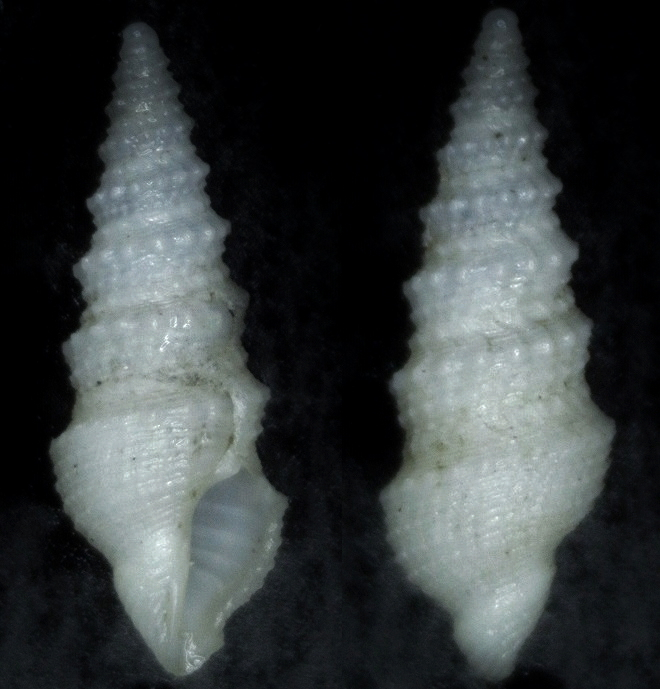
- Image of a shell of Paradrillia inconstans

Scientific classification
- Kingdom: Animalia
- Phylum: Mollusca
- Class: Gastropoda
- Subclass: Caenogastropoda
- Order: Neogastropoda
- Superfamily: Conoidea
- Family: Horaiclavidae
- Genus: Paradrillia
- Species: P. inconstans

Binomial name
- Paradrillia inconstans (E.A. Smith, 1875)

Synonyms
- Clavatula asamusiensis Numura & Zinbo, 1940; Clavatula gaylordae Preston, H.B. 1905; Drillia inconstans (E.A. Smith, 1875); Paradrillia asamusiensis Nomura & Zinbo, 1940; Pleurotoma inconstans E.A. Smith, 1875

= Paradrillia inconstans =

Species of gastropod

Paradrillia inconstans is a species of sea snail, a marine gastropod mollusk in the family Horaiclavidae, the turrids.

== Subspecies ==
- Paradrillia inconstans prunulum (Melvill, J.C. & R. Standen, 1901) (synonyms: Drillia prunulum Melvill, J.C. & R. Standen, 1901; Paradrillia gaylordae Preston, 1905)

== Description ==
The length of the shell attains 15 mm.

== Distribution ==
This marine species occurs off Japan and Queensland, Australia
