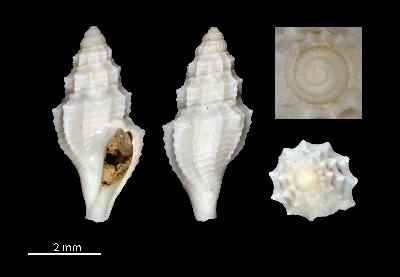
- Shell of Benthomangelia enceladus (museum specimens at MNHN, Paris)

Scientific classification
- Kingdom: Animalia
- Phylum: Mollusca
- Class: Gastropoda
- Subclass: Caenogastropoda
- Order: Neogastropoda
- Superfamily: Conoidea
- Family: Mangeliidae
- Genus: Benthomangelia
- Species: B. enceladus

Binomial name
- Benthomangelia enceladus Figueira & Absalão, 2010

= Benthomangelia enceladus =

Species of gastropod

Benthomangelia enceladus is a species of sea snail, a marine gastropod mollusk in the family Mangeliidae.

== Etymology ==
The specific epithet refers to the moon of Saturn, and is therefore a noun in apposition that does not agree in gender with the genus.

== Distribution ==
This marine species occurs in the Campos Basin, Southeast Brazil.
