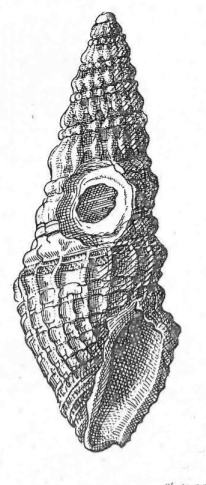
- Original image of Paradrillia alluaudi

Scientific classification
- Kingdom: Animalia
- Phylum: Mollusca
- Class: Gastropoda
- Subclass: Caenogastropoda
- Order: Neogastropoda
- Superfamily: Conoidea
- Family: Horaiclavidae
- Genus: Paradrillia
- Species: P. alluaudi

Binomial name
- Paradrillia alluaudi (Dautzenberg, 1932)

Synonyms
- Drillia alluaudi Dautzenberg, 1932

= Paradrillia alluaudi =

Species of gastropod

Paradrillia alluaudi is a species of sea snail, a marine gastropod mollusk in the family Horaiclavidae.

== Description ==
The length of the shell attains 8 mm, its diameter 3 mm.

The shell is turriculate and has a uniform, grayish white color. It contains a very high spire, composed of 8 whorls divided by two decurrent depressions. The superior is shown under a narrow subsutural bead and the lower encircles the base of the upper whorls. Axial folds pass through the entire surface of the shell and become very prominent and nodular between the two depressions; They are crossed by four decurrent cords that are spaced apart and that restrict the square alveoli. The upper depression persists on the body whorl, as well as the row of nodular axial folds, but these become narrower soon, and become of the same size as the cords. They form with them a regular lattice which ceases only close to the base of the shell where the cords remain alone. The aperture is widely open and is not narrow at the base.

== Distribution ==
This marine species occurs off Madagascar
