= Church Anti-Vivisection League =

Defunct British anti-vivisection organisation

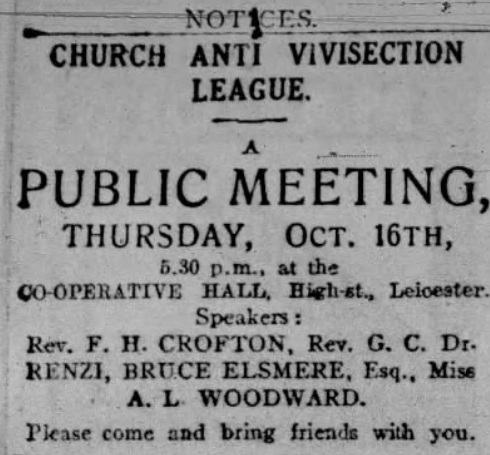
- League public meeting advert from 1919
- Abbreviation: CAVL
- Formation: 1889; 137 years ago
- Founder: John Preston Wright
- Purpose: Anti-vivisection
- Origins: Victoria Street Society
- Region served: United Kingdom

The Church Anti-Vivisection League (CAVL) was an Anglican organisation based in the United Kingdom that campaigned for the abolition of vivisection.

== History ==
The Church Anti-Vivisection League was founded in 1889 by John Preston Wright, Rector of Oldbury, Shropshire. Wright was a lecturer for the Victoria Street Society. He was also the honorary secretary of the League. Wright resigned from the League in 1894 as he was under pressure from managing the organization with his other work. The council elected A. L. Woodward as honorary secretary of the League. (Note: A. L. Woodwood became honorary assistant secretary in 1898 and remained active in the League until her death in 1921.) In 1895, the League became affiliated with the Society for United Prayer Against Cruelty.

In 1896 the League had 300 members, most of which were clergy. Membership was limited to the Anglican Church. The League raised funds for the National Anti-Vivisection Hospital. Alfred S. Hewlett was chairman of the League in 1910. Minnie Gridley was the League's honorary treasurer for many years. Notable non-clergy who spoke at League meetings included Walter Hadwen and Sidney Trist.

The League held an annual festival. In 1936, their head office was located in Aspenden and their chairman was Rev. Richard Daunton Fear.

== Activities ==
The League campaigned for total abolition of vivisection. In 1896, the League requested that clergy on the committee of the Metropolitan Hospital Sunday Fund to only assist hospitals that have no vivisectional laboratories attached to them. The League's executive committee commented that as long as the "clergy contribute to the support of those hospitals which have laboratories attached to them they are directly supporting and subsidising vivisection, and they are alienating from the church an increasing number of their people".

In 1909, members of the League attended the Fourth Triennial International Congress of the World League Against Vivisection held at Caxton Hall. A. L. Woodward took delegates from the congress to a vegetarian restaurant on St Martin's Lane. In 1910, Rev. S. Claude Tickell declared that the League's main concern was undoing the greatest evil of all, the deliberate torture of helpless animals. (Note: Rev. S. Claude Tickell was clerical organising secretary of the League.)

The League campaigned for clergymen such as George H. Frodsham to resign from the Research Defence Society as the society was "torturing thousands of God's creatures every year in the name of science". In 1913, Robert H. Perks was a speaker at a meeting of the League in Southampton. He commented that vivisection is "morally unjustifiable, and diametrically opposed to the teaching of Christ" and that he desired to see it totally prohibited by law.

In 1936, chairman Richard Daunton Fear lecturing in Malvern argued that as all life emanated from God we have no right to take the lives of animals and use them for cruel purposes. He stated that "I should like to see more clergymen of all denominations voicing this moral side of the question from their pulpits, and it is only when the Churches take it up strongly that we shall make real progress".

== See also ==
- Church Society for the Promotion of Kindness to Animals
