= Benthomangelia abyssopacifica =

Scientific classification
- Kingdom: Animalia
- Phylum: Mollusca
- Class: Gastropoda
- Subclass: Caenogastropoda
- Order: Neogastropoda
- Superfamily: Conoidea
- Family: Mangeliidae
- Genus: Benthomangelia
- Species: B. abyssopacifica

Binomial name
- Benthomangelia abyssopacifica Sysoev, 1988

Species of gastropod

Benthomangelia abyssopacifica is a species of sea snail, a marine gastropod mollusk in the family Mangeliidae.

== Distribution ==
This marine species occurs in the Kuril–Kamchatka Trench, Northern Pacific Ocean
