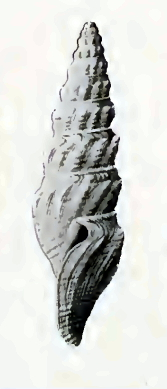
- Original image of a shell of Vexitomina coriorudis

Scientific classification
- Kingdom: Animalia
- Phylum: Mollusca
- Class: Gastropoda
- Subclass: Caenogastropoda
- Order: Neogastropoda
- Superfamily: Conoidea
- Family: Horaiclavidae
- Genus: Vexitomina
- Species: V. coriorudis

Binomial name
- Vexitomina coriorudis (Hedley, 1922)

Synonyms
- Inquisitor coriorudis Hedley, 1922; Paradrillia (Paradrillia) coriorudis (Hedley, 1922)

= Vexitomina coriorudis =

Species of gastropod

Vexitomina coriorudis is a species of sea snail, a marine gastropod mollusk in the family Horaiclavidae.

== Description ==
The length of the shell attains 23 mm.

(Original description) The lanceolate shell has a, subturreted shape. The spire is slender and tall. It contains 10 whorls, of which two constitute the protoconch. The suture is deeply impressed. The colour of the shell is olive-buff, with irregular tawny dashes. The epidermis is thin and fibrous. The sculpture of the earlier whorls show a double row of prominent peripheral beads, arranged about ten to a whorl. By interposition of additional spirals each double bead extends into a short oblique nodose rib. Below the suture is an indefinite band, followed by a distinct and excavate fasciole. The latter is sculptured with fine lunate striae. On the body whorl anterior to the fasciole are about twenty-three prominent but irregular spiral cords, some of which are rendered nodulous by passing over the ribs. The outer lip is sharp and simple. The sinus is wide and V-shaped. The columella is coated with a thin callus.

== Distribution ==
This marine species is endemic to Australia and occurs off Queensland to New South Wales
