= Benthomangelia decapitata =

Scientific classification
- Kingdom: Animalia
- Phylum: Mollusca
- Class: Gastropoda
- Subclass: Caenogastropoda
- Order: Neogastropoda
- Superfamily: Conoidea
- Family: Mangeliidae
- Genus: Benthomangelia
- Species: B. decapitata

Binomial name
- Benthomangelia decapitata Bouchet & Warén, 1980

Species of gastropod

Benthomangelia decapitata is a species of sea snail, a marine gastropod mollusk in the family Mangeliidae.

== Distribution ==
This species occurs in European waters off the British Isles.
