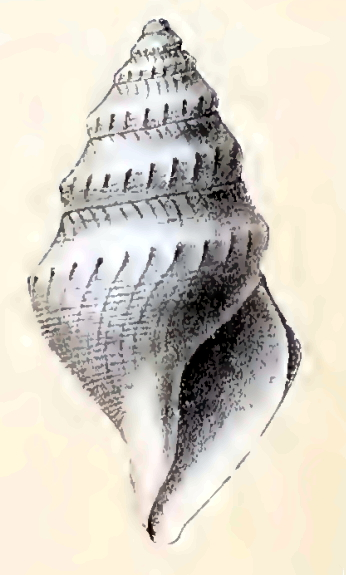
- Image of a shell of Benthomangelia brachytona

Scientific classification
- Kingdom: Animalia
- Phylum: Mollusca
- Class: Gastropoda
- Subclass: Caenogastropoda
- Order: Neogastropoda
- Superfamily: Conoidea
- Family: Mangeliidae
- Genus: Benthomangelia
- Species: B. brachytona

Binomial name
- Benthomangelia brachytona (Watson, 1881)

Synonyms
- Drillia brachytona (Watson, 1881); Pleurotoma brachytona (Watson, 1881) (with a misspelling); Pleurotoma (Drillia) brachytona Watson, 1881 (basionym); Pleurotoma (Spirotropis) brachytona (Watson, 1881); Spirotropis brachytona (Watson, 1881)

= Benthomangelia brachytona =

Species of gastropod

Benthomangelia brachytona is a species of sea snail, a marine gastropod mollusk in the family Mangeliidae.

== Description ==
(Original description) The thin shell is short and broad, biconical, angulated, with small oblique riblets and spiral threads, and with a lop-sided, small-pointed snout.

Sculpture: Longitudinals— on the body whorl there are about twenty small, short, oblique riblets, which are obsolete on the base. They are parted by shallow furrows somewhat broader than they. They are more numerous and sharper on the upper whorls, where they occupy the whole lower third of each whorl. Immediately below the suture there is a minute collar of very small, short, sharp, irregular puckers with intervals of twice their own breadth. Springing from these puckers and coinciding with the riblets are hair-like lines of growth, slightly stronger than the other growth lines which closely cover the whole surface of the shell.

Spirals —there is a slight collar at the top of the whorls, which forms a very minute and irregular shelf on the underside of the suture. About two-thirds down the whorls is a blunt angulation where the longitudinal riblets rise. Besides these, there are on the whole surface flatly rounded threads which are broad, coarse, and irregular on the base, crowded and narrow at the keel, broader, but faint and more regular, on the shoulder.

Colour: alabaster-white.

The spire is irregularly conical. The apex is eroded. The shell contains 8 whorls, making allowance for the eroded apex. They have a long, sloping, slightly concave shoulder, a blunt angulation about two-thirds down, and below this are nearly cylindrical. The fifth whorl enlarges somewhat disproportionately. And the last whorl is swollen, with a sharper angulation than the rest. The base is convexly conical, and is produced into a lop-sided, centrally situated, small-pointed snout. The suture is small but distinct, being slightly channelled by the minute horizontal shelf formed by the edge of the infrasutural collar. There is a very slight contraction of the whorls into it. The aperture is rather small, rhomboidally pear-shaped, being pointed above, prolonged into the rather short and broad siphonal canal below, and having a blunt angulation in the outer lip and at the base of the columella. The outer lip is very thin. It is somewhat rectilinearly curved. Its edge, on leaving the body, retreats immediately to form the shallow rounded open sinus which occupies the shoulder below the suture. Below this it advances with a long oblique forward slope in the line of the riblets, and then, from about the middle, retreats on a very regular curve to the point of the columella. The inner lip has a thin glaze with a defined edge. It is very narrow on the body, but spreads round the columella. It is convex on the body, with a bluntly angular concavity at the base of the columella, which is short, small, conical, unequal-sided, obliquely cut off in front, with a narrow rounded twisted edge.

== Distribution ==
This marine species occurs off New Guinea.
