= Robert H. Perks =

English naturalist, physician and activist (1854–1929)

- Born: Robert Howell Perks; June 1854; Monkton Combe, England
- Died: 11 February 1929 (aged 74); London, England
- Education: Guy's Hospital
- Occupations: Naturalist, physician, activist
- Spouse: Frances Mary Tregaskis (m. 1889)

Robert Howell Perks (June 1854 – 11 February 1929) was an English naturalist, physician and anti-vivisection activist.

== Biography ==
Perks was born in June 1854. He was the eldest son of Henry Perks of Monkton Combe. He was educated at Guy's Hospital where he was house physician and surgeon. He was appointed resident medical officer at Royal Albert Hospital. He qualified MRCS in 1881, FRCS in 1884 and LRCP in 1882. Perks married Frances Mary Tregaskis in October 1889.

In 1890, he became medical superintendent and principal executive officer of Adelaide Hospital in South Australia. He resigned in 1895. After his resignation he became medical attendant and private secretary to Sir Thomas Elder at Birksgate, Glen Osmond. After the death of Elder in 1897, he returned to England with his wife and settled in Torquay. Perks was a naturalist and ornithologist. In 1893, he worked with Edward Charles Stirling Director of the South Australian Museum. He was chairman of the Field Naturalists Society of South Australia in 1895. In 1897, he was thanked by the museum for his gift of a number of photographs of bird nests. He also donated aboriginal skeleton remains and insects. The Natural History Museum purchased 197 of his bird skin specimens.

A species of sea snail Surcula perksi was named after Perks in 1896. In 1898, he was elected a member of the Malacological Society of London.

Perks died on 11 February 1929 at Guy's Hospital, London. He was buried on 15 February in Camden.

== Activism ==
=== Anti-vivisection ===
Perks was an opponent of vivisection on ethical grounds. He considered it a criminal offense. He authored Why I Condemn Vivisection, first published in The Herald of the Golden Age in 1904 which went through seven editions. He commented that "I condemn vivisection because it is productive of a vast amount of severe suffering to animals without any corresponding advantage to them". He was a vice-president of the International Anti-Vivisection and Animal Protection Congress and attended meetings in July 1909.

Perks was a speaker at meetings of the London Anti-Vivisection Society and British Union for the Abolition of Vivisection with Walter Hadwen. In 1913, he was a speaker at a meeting of the Church Anti-Vivisection League in Southampton. He stated that vivisection is "morally unjustifiable, and diametrically opposed to the teaching of Christ" and that he desired to see it totally prohibited by law.

=== Vegetarianism ===
Perks became a vegetarian in 1898 and was a speaker at Vegetarian Society conferences. In the early 1900s, Perks was elected a member of the Order of the Golden Age's General Council and was its Honorary Secretary. He wrote articles supportive of a vegetarian diet for their journal Herald of the Golden Age. In 1907, thirteen medical men including Perks signed a manifesto stating that vegetarianism is "scientifically a sound and satisfactory system of dietetics" and superior to health than meat eating. In 1914, Perks argued for vegetarianism from an ethical basis, commenting that it is the duty of humanitarians to regard animals as friends and not a food source.

== Selected publications ==
- Why I Condemn Vivisection (1904)
- Disease and Vivisectional Research (1909)
- Appendicitis and Vegetarianism (1926)
