= Epideira gabensis =

Scientific classification
- Kingdom: Animalia
- Phylum: Mollusca
- Class: Gastropoda
- Subclass: Caenogastropoda
- Order: Neogastropoda
- Family: Horaiclavidae
- Genus: Epideira
- Species: E. gabensis

Binomial name
- Epideira gabensis Hedley, 1922

Species of gastropod

Epideira gabensis is a species of sea snail, a marine gastropod mollusk in the family Horaiclavidae, the turrids.
