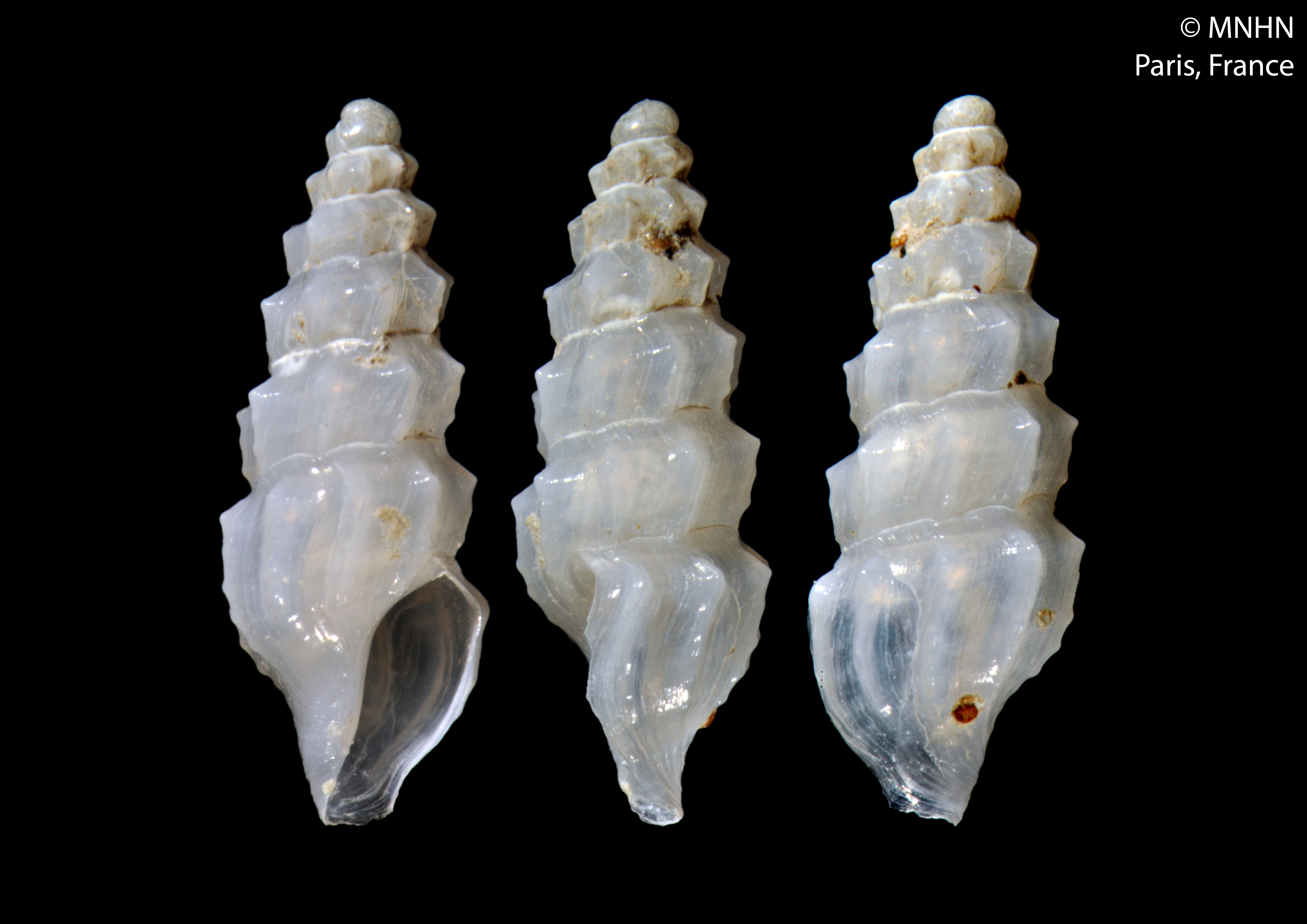
- Shell of Iwaoa invenusta (holotype at MNHN, Paris)

Scientific classification
- Kingdom: Animalia
- Phylum: Mollusca
- Class: Gastropoda
- Subclass: Caenogastropoda
- Order: Neogastropoda
- Superfamily: Conoidea
- Family: Horaiclavidae
- Genus: Iwaoa; Kuroda, 1953

Type species
- Iwaoa reticulata Kuroda, 1953

Species
- See text

= Iwaoa =

Genus of gastropods

Iwaoa is a genus of sea snails, marine gastropod mollusks in the family Horaiclavidae.

== Species ==
Species within the genus Iwaoa include:

- Iwaoa invenusta Kantor, Fedosov & Puillandre, 2018
- Iwaoa reticulata Kuroda, 1953
