= Paradrillia darnleyensis =

Scientific classification
- Kingdom: Animalia
- Phylum: Mollusca
- Class: Gastropoda
- Subclass: Caenogastropoda
- Order: Neogastropoda
- Superfamily: Conoidea
- Family: Horaiclavidae
- Genus: Paradrillia
- Species: P. darnleyensis

Binomial name
- Paradrillia darnleyensis Shuto, 1983

Synonyms
- Paradrillia (Paradrillia) darnleyensis Shuto, T. 1983

Species of gastropod

Paradrillia darnleyensis is a species of sea snail, a marine gastropod mollusk in the family Horaiclavidae.

== Distribution ==
This marine species is endemic to Australia and occurs off Queensland.
