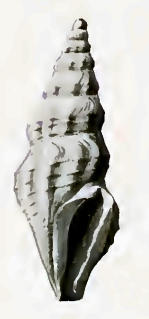
- Drawing of a shell of Vexitomina suavis

Scientific classification
- Kingdom: Animalia
- Phylum: Mollusca
- Class: Gastropoda
- Subclass: Caenogastropoda
- Order: Neogastropoda
- Superfamily: Conoidea
- Family: Horaiclavidae
- Genus: Vexitomina
- Species: V. suavis

Binomial name
- Vexitomina suavis (E.A. Smith, 1888)

Synonyms
- Drillia prosuavis C. Hedley, 1903; Inquisitor suavis (Smith, 1888); Paradrillia (Paradrillia) suavis (E.A. Smith, 1888); Pleurotoma (Drillia) suavis E.A. Smith, 1888; Vexitomina suavis (Smith, 1888)

= Vexitomina suavis =

Species of gastropod

Vexitomina suavis is a species of sea snail, a marine gastropod mollusk in the family Horaiclavidae.

== Description ==
The length of the shell attains 17 mm.

== Distribution ==
This marine species occurs off Australia (New South Wales, Queensland, Victoria); also off the Loyalty Islands and Vietnam.
