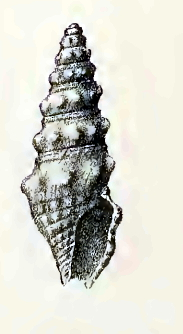
- Original image of a shell of Paradrillia lithoria

Scientific classification
- Kingdom: Animalia
- Phylum: Mollusca
- Class: Gastropoda
- Subclass: Caenogastropoda
- Order: Neogastropoda
- Superfamily: Conoidea
- Family: Horaiclavidae
- Genus: Paradrillia
- Species: P. lithoria

Binomial name
- Paradrillia lithoria (Melvill & Standen, 1903)

Synonyms
- Drillia lithoria Melvill & Standen, 1903

= Paradrillia lithoria =

Species of gastropod

Paradrillia lithoria is a species of sea snail, a marine gastropod mollusk in the family Horaiclavidae, the turrids.

== Description ==
The length of the shell attains 8 mm, its diameter 2.5 mm.

This is a small highly coloured, fusiform species, with a conspicuous, spiral, swollen, nodulous angle just above the centre of the whorls. It contains eight whorls, of which two in the protoconch. The aperture has a square-ovate shape. The outer lip is thin. The sinus is wide but not deep. The siphonal canal is short.

== Distribution ==
This marine species occurs off Bahrein and in the Persian Gulf.
