= Paradrillia dainichiensis =

Scientific classification
- Kingdom: Animalia
- Phylum: Mollusca
- Class: Gastropoda
- Subclass: Caenogastropoda
- Order: Neogastropoda
- Superfamily: Conoidea
- Family: Horaiclavidae
- Genus: Paradrillia
- Species: P. dainichiensis

Binomial name
- Paradrillia dainichiensis (M. Yokoyama, 1923)

Synonyms
- Clavatula (Alticlavatula) dainichiensis (M. Yokoyama, 1923); Clavatula (Paradrillia) dainichiensis (M. Yokoyama, 1923); Clavatula patruelis dainichiensis (M. Yokoyama, 1923); Drillia dainichiensis M. Yokoyama, 1923

Species of gastropod

Paradrillia dainichiensis is a species of sea snail, a marine gastropod mollusk in the family Horaiclavidae.

== Distribution ==
This marine species occurs off Japan. It was also found as a fossil in Pliocene and Quaternary strata in Japan.
