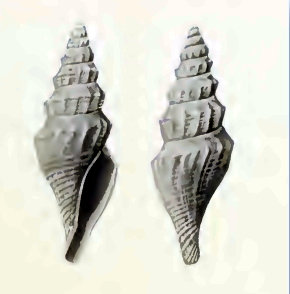
- Original image of a shell of Benthomangelia trophonoidea

Scientific classification
- Kingdom: Animalia
- Phylum: Mollusca
- Class: Gastropoda
- Subclass: Caenogastropoda
- Order: Neogastropoda
- Superfamily: Conoidea
- Family: Mangeliidae
- Genus: Benthomangelia
- Species: B. trophonoidea

Binomial name
- Benthomangelia trophonoidea (Schepman, 1913)

Synonyms
- Surcula trophonoidea M.M. Schepman, 1913

= Benthomangelia trophonoidea =

Species of gastropod

Benthomangelia trophonoidea is a species of sea snail, a marine gastropod mollusk in the family Mangeliidae.

== Description ==
The length of the shell attains 16 mm, its diameter 5 3/4 mm.

(Original description) The thin, white shell has a fusiform shape, with a moderately long siphonal canal. The protoconch is eroded. The shell contains 8 angular whorls, separated by a conspicuous, slightly waved suture, the upper part is excavated. The sculpture consists of narrow, oblique ribs, ending at the excavation with small, slightly pointed tubercles. The excavation is nearly smooth, but with short plicae on a faint subsutural rib, more conspicuous on upper whorls.disappearing on the body whorl and curved growth lines. The lower part of the whorls contains flat lirae, 6 in number on the penultimate whorl, separated by narrow grooves. On the base of the body whorl and siphonal canal, the grooves surpass the lirae in breadth. These lirae are waved and the whole shell is crossed by growth lines, stronger at intervals. The aperture is oblong;, angular above, with a wide siphonal canal below. The peristome is thin, broken. According to growth-lines, with a shallow sinus, then slightly protracted. The columellar side nearly straight, slightly concave above, a little directed to the left, along the siphonal canal, with a thin layer of enamel, not quite concealing the lirae of surface. The interior of the aperture is smooth and white.

== Distribution ==
This marine species occurs in the Flores Sea and the Ceram Sea off Indonesia.
