= Epideira =

Scientific classification
- Kingdom: Animalia
- Phylum: Mollusca
- Class: Gastropoda
- Subclass: Caenogastropoda
- Order: Neogastropoda
- Superfamily: Conoidea
- Family: Horaiclavidae
- Genus: Epideira; Hedley, 1918

Type species
- Clavatula striata Gray, 1826

Species
- See text

Synonyms
- Epidirona Iredale, 1931

Genus of gastropods

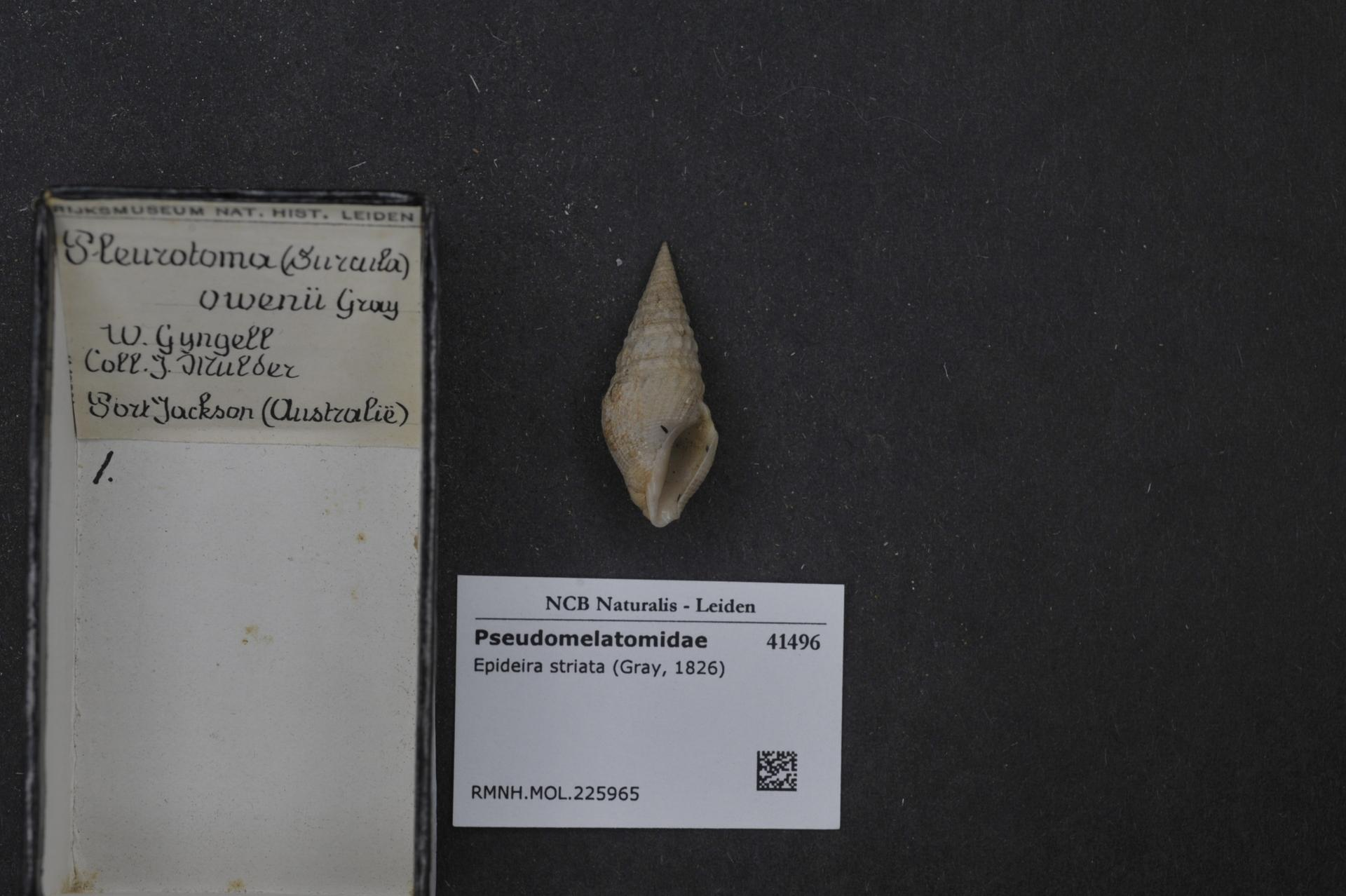
Epideira striata (Gray, 1826)

Epideira is a genus of sea snails, marine gastropod mollusks in the family Horaiclavidae.

== Species ==
Species within the genus Epideira include:

- Epideira beachportensis Cotton & Godfrey, 1938
- Epideira candida (Laseron, 1954)
- Epideira carinata (Laseron, 1954)
- Epideira flindersi Cotton & Godfrey, 1938
- Epideira gabensis Hedley, 1922
- Epideira hedleyi (Iredale, 1931)
- Epideira jaffaensis (Verco, 1909)
- Epideira multiseriata (E. A. Smith, 1877)
- Epideira nodulosa (Laseron, 1954)
- Epideira perksi (Verco, 1896)
- Epideira philipineri (Tenison Woods, 1877)
- Epideira quoyi (Desmoulins, 1842)
- Epideira schoutanica (May, 1911)
- Epideira sibogae (Schepman, 1913)
- Epideira striata (Gray, 1826)
- Epideira torquata Hedley, 1922
- Epideira tuberculata (Laseron, 1954)

Species brought into synonymy

- Epideira beachportensis Cotton & Godfrey, 1938: synonym of Epidirona beachportensis (Cotton & Godfrey, 1938)
- Epideira flindersi Cotton & Godfrey, 1938: synonym of Epidirona flindersi (Cotton & Godfrey, 1938)
- Epideira torquata Hedley, 1922: synonym of Epidirona torquata (Hedley, 1922)
