= Benthomangelia brevis =

Scientific classification
- Kingdom: Animalia
- Phylum: Mollusca
- Class: Gastropoda
- Subclass: Caenogastropoda
- Order: Neogastropoda
- Superfamily: Conoidea
- Family: Mangeliidae
- Genus: Benthomangelia
- Species: B. brevis

Binomial name
- Benthomangelia brevis Sysoev & Ivanov, 1985

Species of gastropod

Benthomangelia brevis is a species of sea snail, a marine gastropod mollusk in the family Mangeliidae.

== Distribution ==
This marine species was found in the Nazca Ridge, Southeast Pacific Ocean
