= Paradrillia felix =

Scientific classification
- Kingdom: Animalia
- Phylum: Mollusca
- Class: Gastropoda
- Subclass: Caenogastropoda
- Order: Neogastropoda
- Superfamily: Conoidea
- Family: Horaiclavidae
- Genus: Paradrillia
- Species: P. felix

Binomial name
- Paradrillia felix (Kuroda, Habe & Oyama, 1971)

Synonyms
- Viridoturris felix Kuroda, Habe & Oyama, 1971

Species of gastropod

Paradrillia felix is a species of sea snail, a marine gastropod mollusk in the family Horaiclavidae, the turrids.

== Description ==
The length of the shell attains 10 mm.

== Distribution ==
This marine species occurs off the coast of Japan.
