= Paradrillia nivalioides =

Scientific classification
- Kingdom: Animalia
- Phylum: Mollusca
- Class: Gastropoda
- Subclass: Caenogastropoda
- Order: Neogastropoda
- Superfamily: Conoidea
- Family: Horaiclavidae
- Genus: Paradrillia
- Species: P. nivalioides

Binomial name
- Paradrillia nivalioides (Yokoyama, M., 1920)

Synonyms
- Pleurotoma nivalioides Yokoyama, 1920

Species of gastropod

Paradrillia nivalioides is a species of sea snail, a marine gastropod mollusk in the family Horaiclavidae.

== Distribution ==
This marine species occurs off Japan. Fossils have also been found in Pliocene strata in Japan.
