= Epideira jaffaensis =

Scientific classification
- Kingdom: Animalia
- Phylum: Mollusca
- Class: Gastropoda
- Subclass: Caenogastropoda
- Order: Neogastropoda
- Family: Horaiclavidae
- Genus: Epideira
- Species: E. jaffaensis

Binomial name
- Epideira jaffaensis (Verco, 1909)

Synonyms
- Drillia jaffaensis Verco, 1909

Species of gastropod

Epideira jaffaensis is a species of sea snail, a marine gastropod mollusk in the family Horaiclavidae.

== Distribution ==
This marine species is endemic to Australia and occurs off South Australia.
