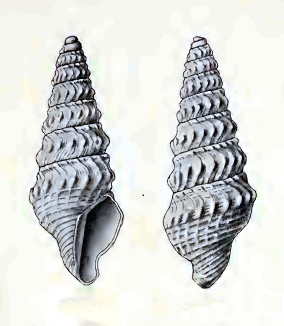
- Original image of a shell of Paradrillia agalma

Scientific classification
- Kingdom: Animalia
- Phylum: Mollusca
- Class: Gastropoda
- Subclass: Caenogastropoda
- Order: Neogastropoda
- Superfamily: Conoidea
- Family: Horaiclavidae
- Genus: Paradrillia
- Species: P. agalma

Binomial name
- Paradrillia agalma (E.A. Smith, 1906)

Synonyms
- Pleurotoma (Surcula) agalma E.A. Smith, 1906

= Paradrillia agalma =

Species of gastropod

Paradrillia agalma is a species of sea snail, a marine gastropod mollusk in the family Horaiclavidae.

== Description ==
The length of the shell attains 18 mm, its diameter 6 mm.

The small fusiform shell contains 11 whorls (the superior ones are eroded), covered with a gray epidermis. The lines of growth are rather strong and very flexuous, and on passing the delicate spiral lirae, except in the concavity above the angle of the whorls and at the base of the body whorl, are delicately nodulous. The last volution below the nodose periphery has about fifteen lirae, of which about six of the upper ones are nodulous, the rest, around the anterior contracted portion, being simple and thread-like. The tubercles on the angle are about eighteen in number, and the lirae above it three or four. The aperture is small. The outer lip is thin. The columella is almost upright and shows a small callus. The siphonal canal is short.

== Distribution ==
This marine species occurs off Sri Lanka.
