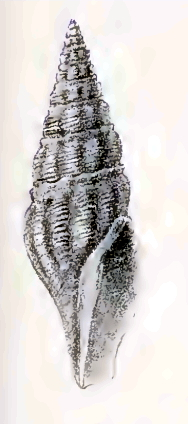
- Original image of a shell of Paradrillia fugata

Scientific classification
- Kingdom: Animalia
- Phylum: Mollusca
- Class: Gastropoda
- Subclass: Caenogastropoda
- Order: Neogastropoda
- Superfamily: Conoidea
- Family: Horaiclavidae
- Genus: Paradrillia
- Species: P. fugata

Binomial name
- Paradrillia fugata (E.A. Smith, 1895)

Synonyms
- Drillia fugata E. A. Smith, 1895

= Paradrillia fugata =

Species of gastropod

Paradrillia fugata is a species of sea snail, a marine gastropod mollusk in the family Horaiclavidae, the turrids.

== Description ==
The length of the shell attains 45 mm, its diameter 14 mm.

(Original description in Latin) The white shell is elongated and turreted and covered with a thin, yellowish-olive epidermis. It is spirally striated and obliquely ribbed. The spire is elongated and sharply pointed. There are ten whorls, which are slightly convex and hollowed out at the top; at the suture, they are wavy and slightly keeled.

Below this hollowed section, the whorls are furnished with oblique ribs—of which there are 11 to 12 on the body whorl—that taper and vanish toward the base. The body whorl is slightly narrowed at the front. The aperture is narrow and white, with a length slightly less than half of the total shell. The outer lip is not deeply notched at the upper hollowed section. The columella is relatively straight and covered with a thin white callus, while the siphonal canal is moderately wide, short, and slightly curved back.

== Distribution ==
This marine species occurs off East India, in the Andaman Sea and off Sri Lanka at bathyal depths (1271 m – 2569 m).
