= Paradrillia sagamiana =

Scientific classification
- Kingdom: Animalia
- Phylum: Mollusca
- Class: Gastropoda
- Subclass: Caenogastropoda
- Order: Neogastropoda
- Superfamily: Conoidea
- Family: Horaiclavidae
- Genus: Paradrillia
- Species: P. sagamiana

Binomial name
- Paradrillia sagamiana Okutani, 1964

Species of gastropod

Paradrillia sagamiana is a species of sea snail, a marine gastropod mollusk in the family Horaiclavidae.

== Distribution ==
This marine species occurs in Sagami Bay, Japan.
