= Paradrillia gemmata =

Scientific classification
- Kingdom: Animalia
- Phylum: Mollusca
- Class: Gastropoda
- Subclass: Caenogastropoda
- Order: Neogastropoda
- Superfamily: Conoidea
- Family: Horaiclavidae
- Genus: Paradrillia
- Species: P. gemmata

Binomial name
- Paradrillia gemmata Shuto, 1983

Synonyms
- Paradrillia (Coronacomitas) gemmata Shuto, 1983

Species of gastropod

Paradrillia gemmata is a species of sea snail, a marine gastropod mollusk in the family Horaiclavidae.

== Distribution ==
This marine species is endemic to Australia and occurs off the Northern Territory.
