= Paradrillia minoensis =

Scientific classification
- Kingdom: Animalia
- Phylum: Mollusca
- Class: Gastropoda
- Subclass: Caenogastropoda
- Order: Neogastropoda
- Superfamily: Conoidea
- Family: Horaiclavidae
- Genus: Paradrillia
- Species: P. minoensis

Binomial name
- Paradrillia minoensis (Shuto Tsugio, 1961)

Synonyms
- † Clavatula (Paradrillia) minoensis Shuto Tsugio, 1961

Extinct species of gastropod

Paradrillia minoensis is an extinct species of sea snail, a marine gastropod mollusk in the family Horaiclavidae.

== Distribution ==
This marine species occurs off Japan.
