= Paradrillia melvilli =

Scientific classification
- Kingdom: Animalia
- Phylum: Mollusca
- Class: Gastropoda
- Subclass: Caenogastropoda
- Order: Neogastropoda
- Superfamily: Conoidea
- Family: Horaiclavidae
- Genus: Paradrillia
- Species: P. melvilli

Binomial name
- Paradrillia melvilli Powell, 1969

Species of gastropod

Paradrillia melvilli is a species of sea snail, a marine gastropod mollusc in the family Horaiclavidae.

== Description ==
The length of the shell attains 8 mm. Its shell is claviform(club-shaped) shell which has 18 or 19 cog like axial nodes per whorl of the shell on its blunt medial peripheral keel(ridge running along the edge of a spiral shell). It has a tall spire which is twice the height of its short anterior canal(groove or tube that protects the siphon).

== Distribution ==
This marine species occurs from the Persian Gulf to Northwest India.
