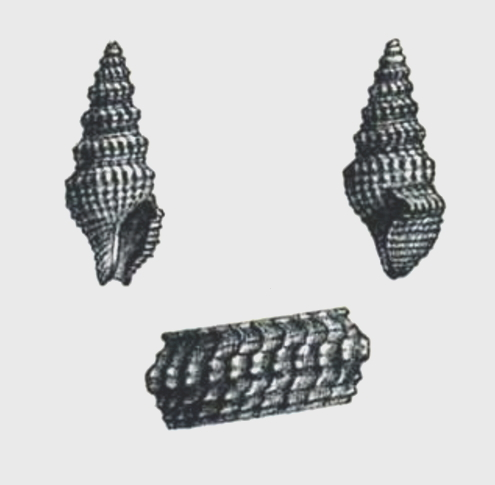
- Original image of a shell of Paradrillia nannodes

Scientific classification
- Kingdom: Animalia
- Phylum: Mollusca
- Class: Gastropoda
- Subclass: Caenogastropoda
- Order: Neogastropoda
- Superfamily: Conoidea
- Family: Horaiclavidae
- Genus: Paradrillia
- Species: P. nannodes

Binomial name
- Paradrillia nannodes (R. Sturany, 1900)

Synonyms
- Pleurotoma (Surcula) nannodes R. Sturany, 1900; Pleurotoma nannodes Sturany, 1900 (original combination)

= Paradrillia nannodes =

Species of gastropod

Paradrillia nannodes is a species of sea snail, a marine gastropod mollusk in the family Horaiclavidae.

== Distribution ==
This marine species occurs in the Red Sea
