= Paradrillia sultana =

Scientific classification
- Kingdom: Animalia
- Phylum: Mollusca
- Class: Gastropoda
- Subclass: Caenogastropoda
- Order: Neogastropoda
- Superfamily: Conoidea
- Family: Horaiclavidae
- Genus: Paradrillia
- Species: P. sultana

Binomial name
- Paradrillia sultana (Thiele, 1925)

Synonyms
- Crassispira sultana Thiele, 1925 (original combination)

Species of gastropod

Paradrillia sultana is a species of sea snail, a marine gastropod mollusk in the family Horaiclavidae.

== Description ==
The length of the shell attains 7.9 mm, its diameter 2.9 mm.

== Distribution ==
This marine species occurs in the Indian Ocean off Tanzania and in the Yellow Sea.
