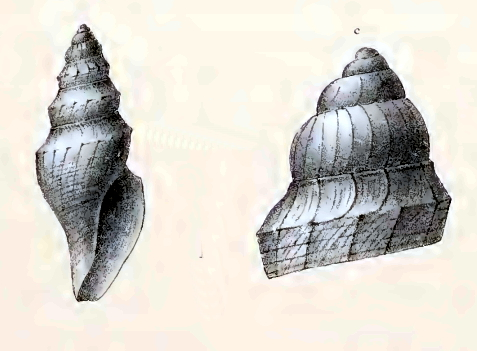
- Image of a shell of Benthomangelia macra (with enlargement)

Scientific classification
- Kingdom: Animalia
- Phylum: Mollusca
- Class: Gastropoda
- Subclass: Caenogastropoda
- Order: Neogastropoda
- Superfamily: Conoidea
- Family: Mangeliidae
- Genus: Benthomangelia
- Species: B. macra

Binomial name
- Benthomangelia macra (R.B. Watson, 1881)

Synonyms
- Pleurotoma (Mangelia) macra Watson, 1881

= Benthomangelia macra =

Species of gastropod

Benthomangelia macra is a species of sea snail, a marine gastropod mollusk in the family Mangeliidae.

== Description ==
The length of the shell varies between 8 mm and 16 mm.

(Original description) The high, narrow shell has a biconical shape. It is fragile, translucent white, glossy, feebly ribbed and spiralled, with a stumpy subscalar spire, ending in a large, conical, sculptured, sharp-tipped dome, and with a small body whorl, contracted base, and produced snout.

Sculpture: Longitudinals—there are on the body whorl about 20 flexuous oblique threads. They rise at the suture, retreat very much in the sinus area, but at the angulation below this they curve forward and die out on the base. The flat intervals which part them are three times their breadth. The system of longitudinal ribs on the embryonic whorls is very much like that of the shell, but is really different. The lines of growth are very fine, and are quite independent of the ribs.

Spirals—below the sinus area there is a blunt angulation strengthened by a row of small tubercles on the ribs. The surface is covered with very obsolete broadish threads, which are crowded on the body, but on the base are stronger, more regular, and wider apart. On the snout they are finer and more crowded. The suture is marginated below by a flat thread.

The colour is almost papyraceous white.

The spire is subscalar, narrow, and would be high but for the abruptness with which it is crowned by the apex, consisting of four yellow conically globose whorls, of which the last is large and dome-shaped, and the first minute, prominent, but at the very tip slightly bent down. The first two are smooth; the last two are sparsely crossed by minute cusplike threads or riblets. The shell contains7 to 8 iwhorls in all, rather high, with a drooping shoulder in the sinus area, which is defined by the angulation below. Below this the upper whorls are nearly cylindrical, while the body whorl is barely convex. This whorl is small. On the base it is a little contracted and drawn out, and is produced into a small and rather lop-sided snout. The suture is minute, but impressed and further defined by the marginal thread. The aperture is small, narrow, pear-shaped, triangular above, and produced below into the relatively broad, open, and deep siphonal canal. The outer lip is flat at the shoulder, feebly angulated at the keel, scarcely convex below. The edge, which is quite independent of the ribs, is very convexly prominent below, with a high and advancing shoulder, above which lies the deep, open-mouthed, rounded sinus. The inner lip is exceedingly narrow. It is thinly cut into the substance of the shell, and very early runs out on the slightly oblique, narrow, twisted edge of the columella, which is straight, narrow, and very slightly angulated at its junction with the body.

== Distribution ==
B. macra can be found in European waters, the Mediterranean Sea, the Atlantic Ocean off the Azores and in Caribbean Sea waters, ranging from the western coast of Florida south to Brazil.
