= Paradrillia kakegawensis =

Scientific classification
- Kingdom: Animalia
- Phylum: Mollusca
- Class: Gastropoda
- Subclass: Caenogastropoda
- Order: Neogastropoda
- Superfamily: Conoidea
- Family: Horaiclavidae
- Genus: Paradrillia
- Species: P. kakegawensis

Binomial name
- Paradrillia kakegawensis (J. Makiyama, 1927)

Synonyms
- Clavatula kakegawensis J. Makiyama, 1927

Species of gastropod

Paradrillia kakegawensis is a species of sea snail, a marine gastropod mollusk in the family Horaiclavidae.

== Distribution ==
This marine species occurs off Japan. It was also found as a fossil in Pliocene strata of Japan.
