= Paradrillia taiwanensis =

Scientific classification
- Kingdom: Animalia
- Phylum: Mollusca
- Class: Gastropoda
- Subclass: Caenogastropoda
- Order: Neogastropoda
- Superfamily: Conoidea
- Family: Horaiclavidae
- Genus: Paradrillia
- Species: P. taiwanensis

Binomial name
- Paradrillia taiwanensis (Nomura, 1935)

Synonyms
- † Clavatula taiwanensis Nomura, 1935

Extinct species of gastropod

Paradrillia taiwanensis is an extinct species of sea snail, a marine gastropod mollusk in the family Horaiclavidae.

== Distribution ==
This marine species occurs off Japan.
