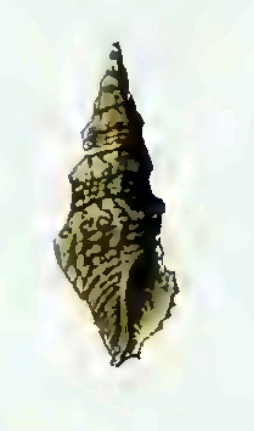
- Original image of a shell of Paradrillia consimilis

Scientific classification
- Kingdom: Animalia
- Phylum: Mollusca
- Class: Gastropoda
- Subclass: Caenogastropoda
- Order: Neogastropoda
- Superfamily: Conoidea
- Family: Horaiclavidae
- Genus: Paradrillia
- Species: P. consimilis

Binomial name
- Paradrillia consimilis (E.A. Smith, 1879)

Synonyms
- † Clavatula (Paradrillia) elachystoma convexiuscula Shuto, 1961 junior subjective synonym; Paradrillia dainitiensis Makiyama Jiro, 1922; Pleurotoma consimilis E.A. Smith, 1879

= Paradrillia consimilis =

Species of gastropod

Paradrillia consimilis is a species of sea snail, a marine gastropod mollusk in the family Horaiclavidae, the turrids.

== Description ==
The length of the shell attains 18.5 mm, its diameter 6.5 mm.

(Original description) The shell is ovately fusiform, turreted, pale fleshy brown. It contains 8 whorls. The first are globular, glassy, smooth, the rest concave above, angled at the middle and a little concave below the angle, longitudinally flexuously obsoletely plicated. The plicae are obsoletely nodulous above at the suture, bearing larger nodules at the angle and two smaller ones beneath it. The nodulesare connected by spiral lirae between the plicae, which are coarser than other intermediate fine spiral lirations. The body whorl is encircled by about fourteen of these transverse lirae, whereof nearly all, with the exception of a few at the base, are more or less granular on the plicae. The aperture measures about two-fifths of the entire length of the shell, light brown. The fissure in the lip, below the suture, and above the nodulous angle, is broad and moderately deep. The outer lip is thin, prominent in the middle, with a very shallow sinuation near the base, smooth and not lirate within. The columella is callous at the base. The siphonal canal is very short. The operculum is elongate, rather acuminate at both ends. The nucleus is terminal.

== Distribution ==
This marine species occurs off Japan and Korea.
