= Benthomangelia grippi =

Scientific classification
- Kingdom: Animalia
- Phylum: Mollusca
- Class: Gastropoda
- Subclass: Caenogastropoda
- Order: Neogastropoda
- Superfamily: Conoidea
- Family: Mangeliidae
- Genus: Benthomangelia
- Species: B. grippi

Binomial name
- Benthomangelia grippi (Anderson, 1964)

Synonyms
- † Microdrillia grippi Anderson, 1964

Extinct species of gastropod

Benthomangelia grippi is an extinct species of sea snail, a marine gastropod mollusk in the family Mangeliidae.

== Distribution ==
This extinct marine species was found in Miocene strata in Germany.
