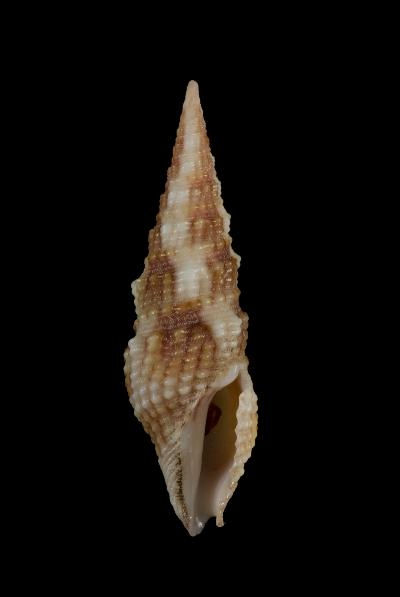
- Shell of Vexitomina regia (museum specimen at MNHN, Paris)

Scientific classification
- Kingdom: Animalia
- Phylum: Mollusca
- Class: Gastropoda
- Subclass: Caenogastropoda
- Order: Neogastropoda
- Superfamily: Conoidea
- Family: Horaiclavidae
- Genus: Vexitomina
- Species: V. regia

Binomial name
- Vexitomina regia (Reeve, 1842)

Synonyms
- Drillia regia (Reeve, 1842); Paradrillia regia (Reeve, 1842); Pleurotoma regia Reeve, 1842; Pleurotoma rougeyroni Souverbie, M. & Montrouzier, R.P. 1874; Turridrupa rougeyroni (Souverbie, 1874)

= Vexitomina regia =

Species of gastropod

Vexitomina regia is a species of sea snail, a marine gastropod mollusk in the family Horaiclavidae.

== Description ==
The periphery shows a double row of nodules. The whorls are smooth above and granulated below it. The anal sinus is small. The color of the shell is whitish maculated with chestnut.

== Distribution ==
This marine species occurs in the Indo-West Pacific (Mauritius, the Philippines, Loyalty Islands) and off Australia (Queensland).
