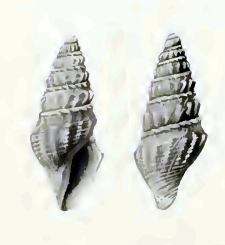
- Two views of a shell of Benthomangelia celebensis

Scientific classification
- Kingdom: Animalia
- Phylum: Mollusca
- Class: Gastropoda
- Subclass: Caenogastropoda
- Order: Neogastropoda
- Superfamily: Conoidea
- Family: Mangeliidae
- Genus: Benthomangelia; Thiele, 1925

Type species
- Surcula trophonoidea Schepman, 1913

Species
- See text

= Benthomangelia =

Genus of gastropods

Benthomangelia is a genus of sea snails, marine gastropod mollusks in the family Mangeliidae.

== Species ==
Species within the genus Benthomangelia include:

- Benthomangelia abyssopacifica Sysoev, 1988
- Benthomangelia antonia (Dall, 1881)
- Benthomangelia bandella (Dall, 1881)
- Benthomangelia brachytona (Watson, 1881)
- Benthomangelia brevis Sysoev & Ivanov, 1985
- Benthomangelia celebensis (Schepman, 1913)
- Benthomangelia decapitata Bouchet & Warén, 1980
- Benthomangelia enceladus Figueira & Absalão, 2010
- Benthomangelia gracilispira (Powell, 1969)
- † Benthomangelia grippi (Anderson, 1964)
- Benthomangelia macra (Watson, 1881)
- † Benthomangelia praegrateloupi Lozouet, 2017
- Benthomangelia trophonoidea (Schepman, 1913)
- † Benthomangelia venusta (Peyrot, 1931)

Species brought into synonymy

- Benthomangelia diomedeae A.E. Verrill & S. Smith, 1884: synonym of Benthomangelia antonia (Dall, 1881)
- Benthomangelia incincta R.B. Watson, 1881 : synonym of Benthomangelia antonia (Dall, 1881)
- Benthomangelia innocens K.H.J. Thiele, 1925: synonym of Benthomangelia antonia (Dall, 1881)
- Benthomangelia subtrophonoidea Okutani, 1964: synonym of Propebela subtrophonoidea (Okutani, 1964)
