= Epideira torquata =

Scientific classification
- Kingdom: Animalia
- Phylum: Mollusca
- Class: Gastropoda
- Subclass: Caenogastropoda
- Order: Neogastropoda
- Superfamily: Conoidea
- Family: Horaiclavidae
- Genus: Epideira
- Species: E. torquata

Binomial name
- Epideira torquata Hedley, 1922

Synonyms
- Epidirona torquata (Hedley, 1922); Pleurotoma philipineri; auct.

Species of gastropod

Epideira torquata is a species of sea snail, a marine gastropod mollusk in the family Horaiclavidae.

== Distribution ==
This marine species is endemic to Australia and occurs off Tasmania and Victoria.
