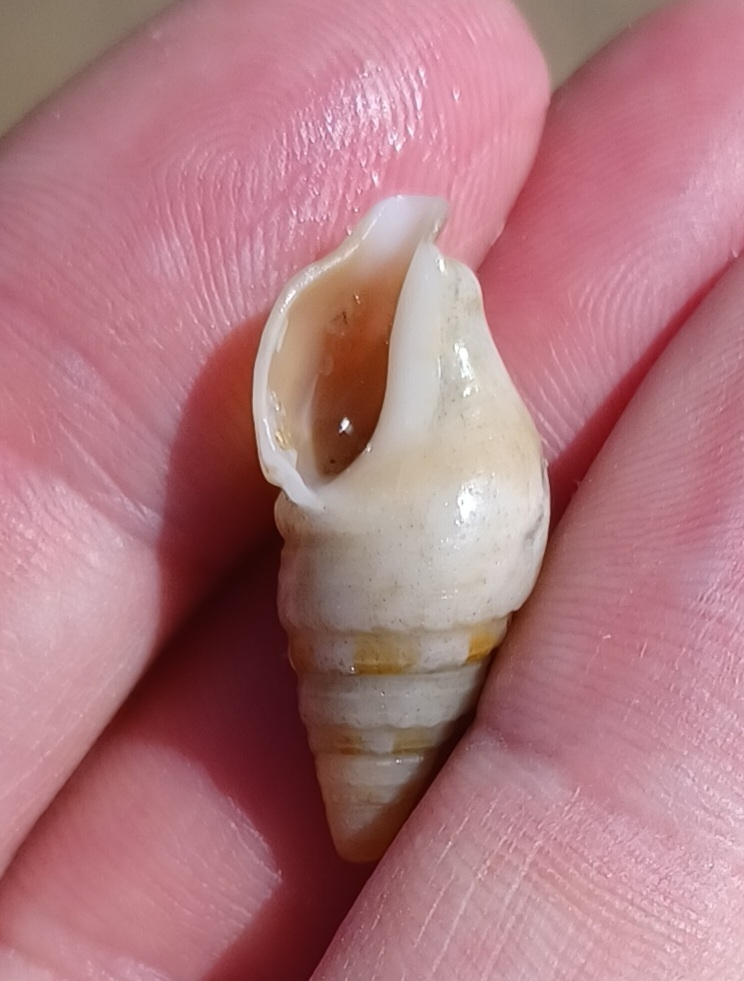

Scientific classification
- Kingdom: Animalia
- Phylum: Mollusca
- Class: Gastropoda
- Subclass: Caenogastropoda
- Order: Neogastropoda
- Superfamily: Conoidea
- Family: Horaiclavidae
- Genus: Epideira
- Species: E. philipineri

Binomial name
- Epideira philipineri (Tenison-Woods, 1877)

Synonyms
- Epidirona philipineri (Tenison Woods, 1877); Pleurotoma philipineri Tenison-Woods, 1877

= Epideira philipineri =

Species of gastropod

Epideira philipineri is a species of sea snail, a marine gastropod mollusk in the family Horaiclavidae.

== Distribution ==
This marine species is endemic to Australia and occurs off Tasmania and Victoria.
