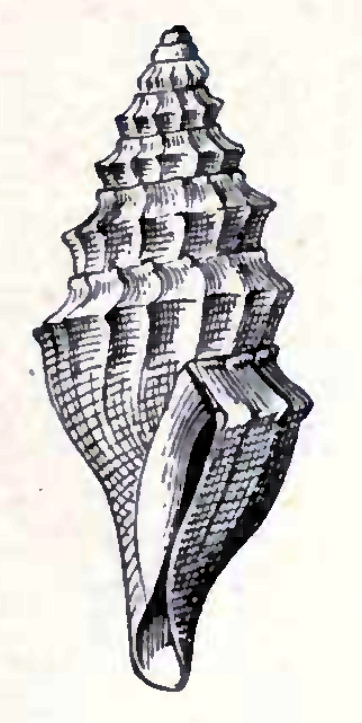
- Image of a shell of Benthomangelia bandella

Scientific classification
- Kingdom: Animalia
- Phylum: Mollusca
- Class: Gastropoda
- Subclass: Caenogastropoda
- Order: Neogastropoda
- Superfamily: Conoidea
- Family: Mangeliidae
- Genus: Benthomangelia
- Species: B. bandella

Binomial name
- Benthomangelia bandella (Dall, 1881)

Synonyms
- Daphnella bandella (Dall, 1881); Mangelia bandella (Dall, 1881); Mangilia bandella (Dall, 1881); Pleurotoma (Mangilia) bandella Dall, 1881 (original combination); Pleurotomella bandella (Dall, 1881)

= Benthomangelia bandella =

Species of gastropod

Benthomangelia bandella is a species of sea snail, a marine gastropod mollusk in the family Mangeliidae.

== Description ==
The length of the shell attains 9.5 mm, its diameter 3.75 mm.

(Original description) The thin, white, polished shell has a fusiform shape and contains 8 whorls; The protoconch is smooth. The succeeding whorl or two are scalariform, by reason of sharp scale-like transverse lamellae. The remaining whorls show sharp transverse ridges prominent on the spire and on the posterior half of the body whorl (where there are eighteen of them) and obsolete on the anterior half. These ridges rise into points where they cross the carina in front of the notch-band and the ante-sutural rib. Of other transverse sculpture, there are only the lines of growth which are prominent only where they cross the band marking the track of the notch. The revolving sculpture consists of a rather stout rib closely appressed to the suture forming one margin of the band, the other edge of which forms a carina, in advance of which are (on the body whorl 20–23) flattened riblets with about equal interspaces which extend with regularity to the anterior end of the siphonal canal. The aperture is equal to half the total length, margins and columella are thin. The notch is broad and shallow, leaving a very distinct band. The spire is moderately pointed.

== Distribution ==
B. bandella can be found in Atlantic Ocean waters, ranging from the Gulf of Maine, the eastern coast of Florida south to the Lesser Antilles.
