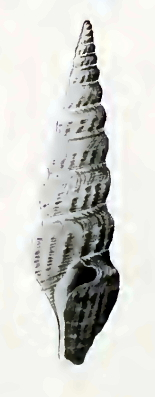
- Original image of a shell of Vexitomina coxi

Scientific classification
- Kingdom: Animalia
- Phylum: Mollusca
- Class: Gastropoda
- Subclass: Caenogastropoda
- Order: Neogastropoda
- Superfamily: Conoidea
- Family: Horaiclavidae
- Genus: Vexitomina
- Species: V. coxi

Binomial name
- Vexitomina coxi (Angas G.F., 1867)

Synonyms
- Drillia agnewia Tenison-Woods, 1879; Drillia coxi Angas, 1867; Drillia trailli Pritchard, G.B. & Gatliff, J.H. 1906; Inquisitor coxi (Angas, 1867); Paradrillia (Paradrillia) coxi (Angas, 1867); Paradrillia agnewi Tenison-Woods, 1879; Pleurotoma (Drillia) coxi (Angas, 1867)

= Vexitomina coxi =

Species of gastropod

Vexitomina coxi, common name Cox's turrid, is a species of sea snail, a marine gastropod mollusk in the family Horaiclavidae.

== Description ==
Vexitomina coxi, also known as Cox's turrid, is a small, fawn-colored sea snail (a marine gastropod) from Australia, characterized by its turreted shell with concave whorls, strong axial ribs crossed by 10-20 spiral cords, creating nodules, and a distinct anal sinus on the outer lip near the suture, with a callus pad on the smooth columella, often showing irregular dark patches.

== Distribution ==
This marine species is endemic to Australia and occurs off New South Wales, Queensland, Tasmania and Victoria
