= Vexitomina torquata =

Scientific classification
- Kingdom: Animalia
- Phylum: Mollusca
- Class: Gastropoda
- Subclass: Caenogastropoda
- Order: Neogastropoda
- Superfamily: Conoidea
- Family: Horaiclavidae
- Genus: Vexitomina
- Species: V. torquata

Binomial name
- Vexitomina torquata Laseron, 1954

Synonyms
- Paradrillia pilazona Laseron, 1954; Vexitomina pilazona Laseron, 1954

Species of gastropod

Vexitomina torquata is a species of sea snail, a marine gastropod mollusk in the family Horaiclavidae.

== Description ==
The length of the shell varies between 15 mm and 20 mm.

== Distribution ==
This marine species is endemic to Australia and occurs off New South Wales, Queensland and Victoria.
