= Epideira nodulosa =

Scientific classification
- Kingdom: Animalia
- Phylum: Mollusca
- Class: Gastropoda
- Subclass: Caenogastropoda
- Order: Neogastropoda
- Superfamily: Conoidea
- Family: Horaiclavidae
- Genus: Epideira
- Species: E. nodulosa

Binomial name
- Epideira nodulosa (Laseron, 1954)

Synonyms
- Epidirona nodulosa Laseron, 1954 (original combination)

Species of gastropod

Epideira nodulosa is a species of sea snail, a marine gastropod mollusk in the family Horaiclavidae.

== Distribution ==
This marine species is endemic to Australia and occurs off New South Wales.
