= Epideira tuberculata =

Scientific classification
- Kingdom: Animalia
- Phylum: Mollusca
- Class: Gastropoda
- Subclass: Caenogastropoda
- Order: Neogastropoda
- Superfamily: Conoidea
- Family: Horaiclavidae
- Genus: Epideira
- Species: E. tuberculata

Binomial name
- Epideira tuberculata Laseron, 1954

Synonyms
- Epidirona costifera Laseron, 1954; Epidirona tuberculata Laseron, 1954 (original combination)

Species of gastropod

Epideira tuberculata is a species of sea snail, a marine gastropod mollusk in the family Horaiclavidae.

== Distribution ==
This marine species is endemic to Australia and occurs off New South Wales and Queensland.
