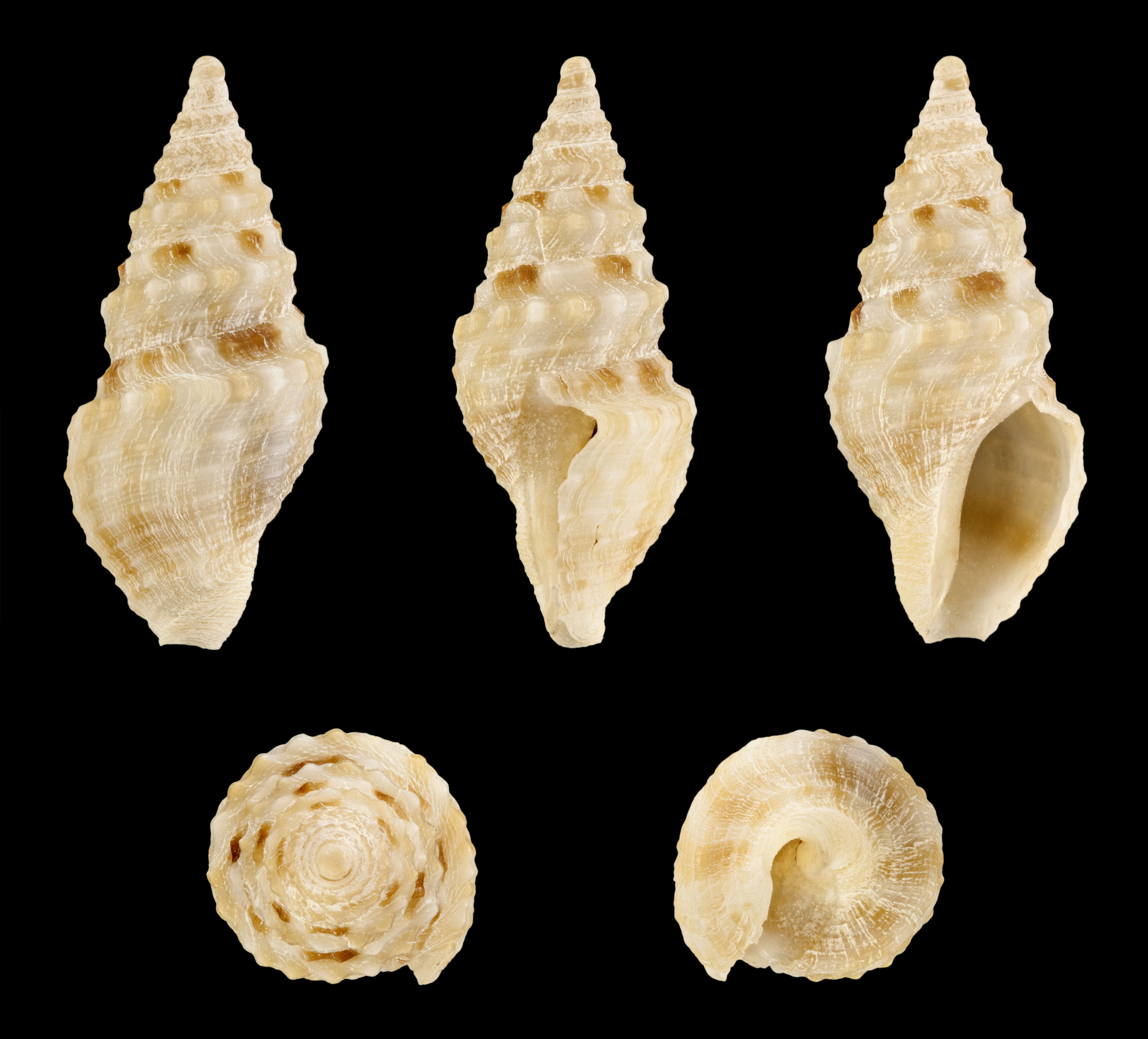
- Shell of Epideira quoyi

Scientific classification
- Kingdom: Animalia
- Phylum: Mollusca
- Class: Gastropoda
- Subclass: Caenogastropoda
- Order: Neogastropoda
- Superfamily: Conoidea
- Family: Horaiclavidae
- Genus: Epideira
- Species: E. quoyi

Binomial name
- Epideira quoyi (Desmoulins, 1842)

Synonyms
- Clavatula monile (Kiener, 1840); Drillia quoyi (Desmoulins, 1842); Epidirona quoyi (Desmoulins, 1842); Hemipleurotoma quoyi (Desmoulins, 1842); Pleurotoma monile Kiener, L.C. 1840; Pleurotoma quoyi Desmoulins, 1842

= Epideira quoyi =

Species of gastropod

Epideira quoyi is a species of sea snail, a marine gastropod mollusk in the family Horaiclavidae.

== Description ==
The length of the shell attains 25 mm.

== Distribution ==
This marine species is endemic to Australia and occurs off South Australia, Tasmania and Victoria.
