= Epideira flindersi =

Scientific classification
- Kingdom: Animalia
- Phylum: Mollusca
- Class: Gastropoda
- Subclass: Caenogastropoda
- Order: Neogastropoda
- Superfamily: Conoidea
- Family: Horaiclavidae
- Genus: Epideira
- Species: E. flindersi

Binomial name
- Epideira flindersi Cotton & Godfrey, 1938

Synonyms
- Epidirona flindersi (Cotton & Godfrey, 1938)

Species of gastropod

Epideira flindersi is a species of sea snail, a marine gastropod mollusk in the family Horaiclavidae, the turrids.

== Distribution ==
This marine species is endemic to Australia and occurs off South Australia.
