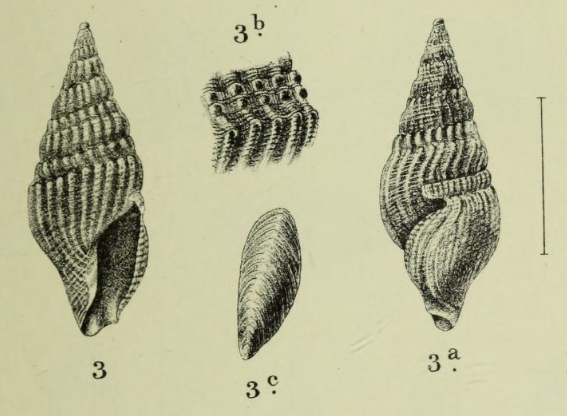

Scientific classification
- Kingdom: Animalia
- Phylum: Mollusca
- Class: Gastropoda
- Subclass: Caenogastropoda
- Order: Neogastropoda
- Superfamily: Conoidea
- Family: Horaiclavidae
- Genus: Epideira
- Species: E. perksi

Binomial name
- Epideira perksi (Verco, 1896)

Synonyms
- Epidirona perksi (Verco, 1896); Hemipleurotoma perksi (Verco, 1896); Surcula perksi Verco, 1896

= Epideira perksi =

Species of gastropod

Epideira perksi is a species of sea snail, a marine gastropod mollusk in the family Horaiclavidae.

== Description ==
The length of the shell attains 20 mm, its diameter 8.25 mm.

Epideira perksi was originally named Surcula perksi. It was named after Robert H. Perks in 1896. Conchologist Joseph Verco was the first to write a description of Surcula perksi in the Transactions of the Royal Society of South Australia.

(Original description) The shell is solid, fusiformly ovate, and imperforate. It consists of ten whorls, including a smooth, inflated, horn-colored, two-whorl protoconch. The spire is distinct with an impressed suture, finely crenulated. The whorls are slightly convex, featuring a groove at the junction of the upper and middle third, with a double row of granules just above the groove and another row immediately below it. The shell exhibits numerous longitudinal, wavy plicae, about as wide as the intervals between them, and slightly lower in height, rounded, with around 25 on the penultimate whorl. Fine spiral striae cross the plicae, making them granular, with about 15 striae on the penultimate whorl.

The body whorl is slightly inflated and contracts toward the base, with the upper part having similar sculpturing to the spire. There are about 40 longitudinal, granular plicae on the body whorl, which follow the sinuosities of the outer lip. These plicae fade toward the extreme base, becoming more crowded and less distinct near the aperture, and are cut by irregular transverse striae, which alternate between larger and smaller sizes.

The aperture is obliquely elongate-ovate, narrowing near the suture. The outer lip is thin and sharp, featuring a well-marked sinus approximately 3 mm deep, with the center located 2.5 mm from the suture. The sides of the lip are convex, with a concave bottom near the row of tiny nodules in front of the groove. There is also a shallow, wide anterior sinus just behind the notch of the siphonal canal. The siphonal canal itself is short, wide, and open, with a rather large, oblique notch; its left margin extends slightly beyond the right, and both margins are slightly everted.

The columella is straight with a slight sinistral deviation near the anterior, and is smooth from the removal of sculpture. The callus is thin, applied, and inconspicuous, barely free at the anterior extremity. The shell's ornamentation is greyish-white with small, deep rust-colored spots along the rows of granules just below the suture (sometimes continuing as wavy longitudinal lines), and on the spiral row just beneath the sinus groove. Finer spiral lines of spots can be seen on alternating rows of costal granules, extending over the body whorl to the base. The aperture is white. The operculum is moderately large and elongate-ovate.

== Distribution ==
This marine species is endemic to Australia and occurs off South Australia. Epideira perksi were first found off Thistle Island at a depth of 6 feet in weed.
