= Epideira schoutanica =

Scientific classification
- Kingdom: Animalia
- Phylum: Mollusca
- Class: Gastropoda
- Subclass: Caenogastropoda
- Order: Neogastropoda
- Superfamily: Conoidea
- Family: Horaiclavidae
- Genus: Epideira
- Species: E. schoutanica

Binomial name
- Epideira schoutanica (May, 1911)

Synonyms
- Drillia schoutanica May, 1911; Epidirona schoutanica (May, 1911)

Species of gastropod

Epideira schoutanica is a species of sea snail, a marine gastropod mollusk in the family Horaiclavidae.

== Distribution ==
This marine species is endemic to Australia and occurs off South Australia, Tasmania and Victoria.
