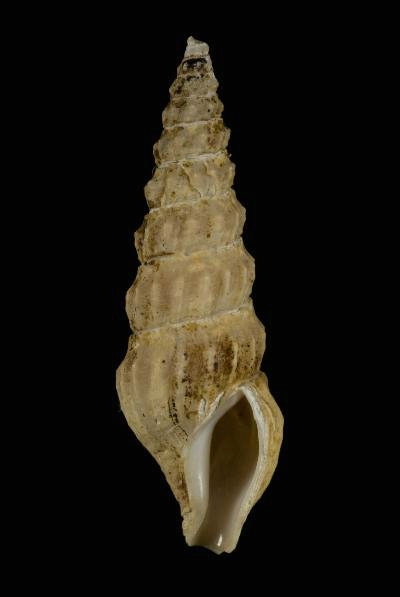
- Shell of Iwaoa reticulata (specimen at MNHN, paris]

Scientific classification
- Kingdom: Animalia
- Phylum: Mollusca
- Class: Gastropoda
- Subclass: Caenogastropoda
- Order: Neogastropoda
- Superfamily: Conoidea
- Family: Horaiclavidae
- Genus: Iwaoa
- Species: I. reticulata

Binomial name
- Iwaoa reticulata T. Kuroda, 1953

Synonyms
- Paradrillia reticulata Kuroda, 1953

= Iwaoa reticulata =

Species of gastropod

Iwaoa reticulata is a species of sea snail, a marine gastropod mollusk in the family Horaiclavidae.

It was previously included within the family Clavatulidae.

== Description ==
The length of the shell attains 22.5 mm.

== Distribution ==
This species occurs in the East China Sea and Suruga Bay to Tosa Bay, Japan, at a depth between 200 m and 300 m; also in the Bismarck Sea.
