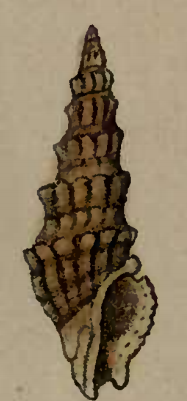
- Drawing of a shell of Drillia barkliensis

Scientific classification
- Kingdom: Animalia
- Phylum: Mollusca
- Class: Gastropoda
- Subclass: Caenogastropoda
- Order: Neogastropoda
- Superfamily: Conoidea
- Family: Drilliidae
- Genus: Drillia
- Species: D. barkliensis

Binomial name
- Drillia barkliensis H. Adams, 1869

Synonyms
- Brachytoma barkliensis Gravely, 1942; Crassispira barkliensis (Adams, H.G., 1869); Crassispira strigata Sowerby II, 1874; Drillia rougeyroni (Souverbie in Souverbie & Montrouzier, 1874); Drillia strigata G. B. Sowerby II, 1874; Pleurotoma (Crassispira) barklyensis von Martens, 1880; Pleurotoma barclayana Paetel, 1888; Turridrupa barkliensis H. Adams, 1869

= Drillia barkliensis =

Species of gastropod

Drillia barkliensis is a species of sea snail, a marine gastropod mollusk in the family Drilliidae.

== Description ==
The whorls are granulated minutely, with a tuberculated shoulder. The shell is chocolate- or orange-brown, the latter often white-banded above the shoulder, and sometimes with an inferior narrow darker band. The tubercles and usually the granules are white. The shell grows to a length of 25 mm (0.98 in).

== Distribution ==
This species occurs in the Indian Ocean off Mauritius and in the Pacific Ocean off New Caledonia.
