= Epideira beachportensis =

Scientific classification
- Kingdom: Animalia
- Phylum: Mollusca
- Class: Gastropoda
- Subclass: Caenogastropoda
- Order: Neogastropoda
- Family: Horaiclavidae
- Genus: Epideira
- Species: E. beachportensis

Binomial name
- Epideira beachportensis Cotton & Godfrey, 1938

Synonyms
- Epidirona beachportensis (Cotton & Godfrey, 1938)

Species of gastropod

Epideira beachportensis is a species of sea snail, a marine gastropod mollusk in the family Horaiclavidae.
