= Epideira hedleyi =

Scientific classification
- Kingdom: Animalia
- Phylum: Mollusca
- Class: Gastropoda
- Subclass: Caenogastropoda
- Order: Neogastropoda
- Superfamily: Conoidea
- Family: Horaiclavidae
- Genus: Epideira
- Species: E. hedleyi

Binomial name
- Epideira hedleyi (Iredale, 1931)

Synonyms
- Epidirona hedleyi Iredale, 1931

Species of gastropod

Epideira hedleyi, common name the striated turrid, is a species of sea snail, a marine gastropod mollusk in the family Horaiclavidae.

== Distribution ==
This marine species is endemic to Australia and occurs off New South Wales.
