= Epideira candida =

Scientific classification
- Kingdom: Animalia
- Phylum: Mollusca
- Class: Gastropoda
- Subclass: Caenogastropoda
- Order: Neogastropoda
- Family: Horaiclavidae
- Genus: Epideira
- Species: E. candida

Binomial name
- Epideira candida (Laseron, 1954)

Synonyms
- Epidirona candida Laseron, 1954

Species of gastropod

Epideira candida is a species of sea snail, a marine gastropod mollusk in the family Horaiclavidae.

== Distribution ==
This marine species is endemic to Australia and occurs off New South Wales, Australia.
