= Benthomangelia gracilispira =

Scientific classification
- Kingdom: Animalia
- Phylum: Mollusca
- Class: Gastropoda
- Subclass: Caenogastropoda
- Order: Neogastropoda
- Superfamily: Conoidea
- Family: Mangeliidae
- Genus: Benthomangelia
- Species: B. gracilispira

Binomial name
- Benthomangelia gracilispira (A.W.B. Powell, 1969)

Synonyms
- Marshallena gracilispira A.W.B. Powell, 1969

Species of gastropod

Benthomangelia gracilispira is a species of sea snail, a marine gastropod mollusk in the family Mangeliidae.

== Distribution ==
This marine species is found off Kalimantan, Indonesia, at a depth of 558 m.
