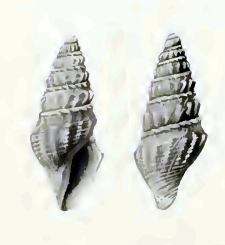
- Original image of a shell of Benthomangelia celebensis

Scientific classification
- Kingdom: Animalia
- Phylum: Mollusca
- Class: Gastropoda
- Subclass: Caenogastropoda
- Order: Neogastropoda
- Superfamily: Conoidea
- Family: Mangeliidae
- Genus: Benthomangelia
- Species: B. celebensis

Binomial name
- Benthomangelia celebensis (Schepman, 1913)

Synonyms
- Paradrillia celebensis (Schepman, M.M., 1913); Surcula celebensis Schepman, 1913

= Benthomangelia celebensis =

Species of gastropod

Benthomangelia celebensis is a species of sea snail, a marine gastropod mollusk in the family Mangeliidae.

== Description ==
The length of the shell attains 8.5 mm, its diameter 3.5 mm.

(Original description) The small shell has a subbiconical shape with a short siphonal canal and a subgradate spire. It is thin, subpellucid and white. It contains 6½ whorls, of which nearly 2 form a smooth, shining, convexly-whorled protoconch. The subsequent whorls are angular, excavated above, separated by a conspicuous, irregularly waved suture, with a rather strong rib just below it, with short bead-like folds. The lower part of whorls shows oblique ribs, 15 in number on the body whorl, tubercled at their upper part below the excavation. Moreover, the basal part of whorls is crossed by faint spirals, 2 in number on the penultimate whorl, about 10 in a slightly contracted body whorl, of which latter the upper ones are more conspicuous, bead-like in crossing the ribs. Those on the siphonal canal are plain. Lastly the whorls are crossed by growth lines. The aperture is elongately oval, angular above, with a short, wide siphonal canal below. The peristome is thin, broken, according to growth lines with a wide, rather deep sinus above, then considerably protracted, columellar side concave above, slightly tortuous below, with a conspicuous, appressed layer of enamel.

== Distribution ==
This marine species occurs off Sulawesi, Indonesia.
