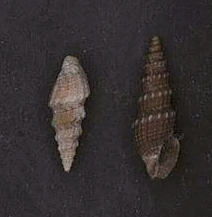
- Shells of Vexitomina metcalfei (museum specimens at Naturalis Biodiversity Center)

Scientific classification
- Kingdom: Animalia
- Phylum: Mollusca
- Class: Gastropoda
- Subclass: Caenogastropoda
- Order: Neogastropoda
- Superfamily: Conoidea
- Family: Horaiclavidae
- Genus: Vexitomina
- Species: V. metcalfei

Binomial name
- Vexitomina metcalfei (Angas G.F., 1867)

Synonyms
- Drillia metcalfei Angas, 1867; Inquisitor metcalfei (Angas, 1867); Pleurotoma metcalfei (Angas, 1867)

= Vexitomina metcalfei =

Species of gastropod

Vexitomina metcalfei is a species of sea snail, a marine gastropod mollusk in the family Horaiclavidae.

== Description ==
The length of the shell attains 20 mm.

The holotype is a faded shell in the British Museum. This species varies in size, colour, and sculpture. It reaches a length of 20 mm., with nineteen tubercules on the penultimate whorl, and is usually dark chestnut picked out with buff on the shoulder nodules. The operculum is unguiculate with a terminal nucleus.

== Distribution ==
This marine species is endemic to Australia and occurs off New South Wales and Queensland.
