= Epideira multiseriata =

Scientific classification
- Kingdom: Animalia
- Phylum: Mollusca
- Class: Gastropoda
- Subclass: Caenogastropoda
- Order: Neogastropoda
- Superfamily: Conoidea
- Family: Horaiclavidae
- Genus: Epideira
- Species: E. multiseriata

Binomial name
- Epideira multiseriata (E.A. Smith, 1877)

Synonyms
- Epidirona multiseriata (E. A. Smith, 1877); Pleurotoma multiseriata E.A. Smith, 1877; Turris (Gemmula) multiseriata (E. A. Smith, 1877)

Species of gastropod

Epideira multiseriata is a species of sea snail, a marine gastropod mollusk in the family Horaiclavidae.

== Distribution ==
This marine species occurs in the Persian Gulf, Sri Lanka and the China Seas.
