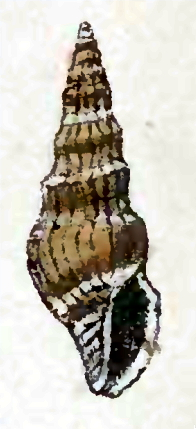
- Image of a shell of Paradrillia patruelis

Scientific classification
- Kingdom: Animalia
- Phylum: Mollusca
- Class: Gastropoda
- Subclass: Caenogastropoda
- Order: Neogastropoda
- Superfamily: Conoidea
- Family: Horaiclavidae
- Genus: Paradrillia
- Species: P. patruelis

Binomial name
- Paradrillia patruelis (E.A. Smith, 1875)

Synonyms
- Vexitomina chinensis Ma, 1989; Clavatula patruelis (E.A. Smith, 1875à; Pleurotoma patruelis E.A. Smith, 1875

= Paradrillia patruelis =

Species of gastropod

Paradrillia patruelis is a species of sea snail, a marine gastropod mollusk in the family Horaiclavidae.

== Description ==
The length of the shell attains 18 mm.

The reddish brown shell shows a white narrow band on the periphery, and, on the body whorl, a second inferior band. It contains 12½ whorls, with obsolete flexuous longitudinal plications, crossed by revolving lines. These are nodulous at the periphery, and less distinctly so inferiorly. The operculum has a subcentral nucleus.

== Distribution ==
This marine species occurs off Korea, the Philippines and off Réunion; in the Bohai Gulf and Yellow Sea.
