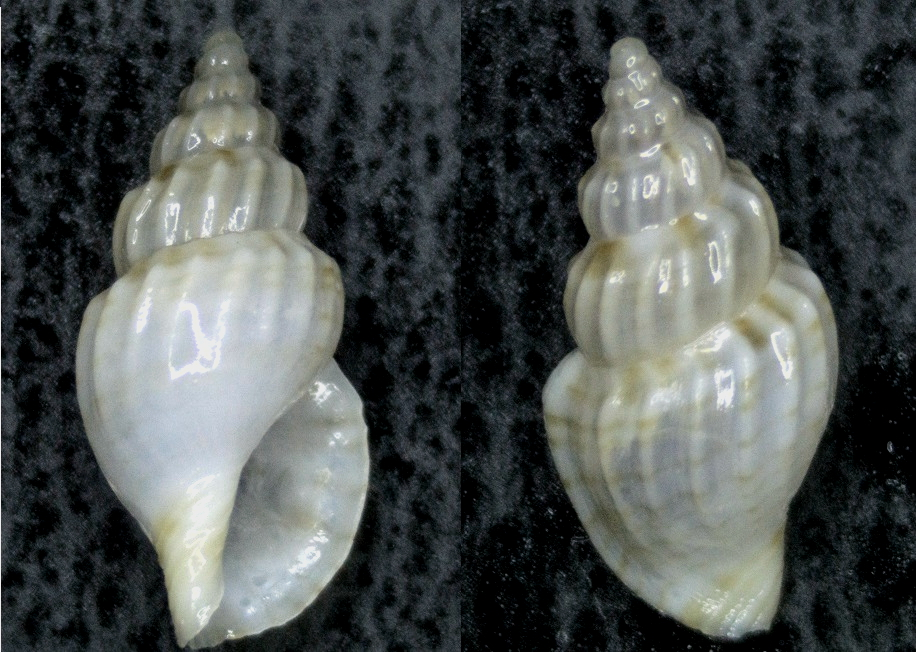
- Shell of Horaiclavus filicinctus

Scientific classification
- Kingdom: Animalia
- Phylum: Mollusca
- Class: Gastropoda
- Subclass: Caenogastropoda
- Order: Neogastropoda
- Superfamily: Conoidea
- Family: Horaiclavidae
- Genus: Horaiclavus
- Species: H. filicinctus

Binomial name
- Horaiclavus filicinctus (E. A. Smith, 1882)

Synonyms
- Bela filicinctus (E. A. Smith, 1882); Clavus filicinctus (E. A. Smith, 1882); Lora suganumana Nomura, S., 1940; Mangilia filicinctus (E. A. Smith, 1882); Pleurotoma (Mangilia) filicincta Smith E. A., 1882 (original combination)

= Horaiclavus filicinctus =

Species of gastropod

Horaiclavus filicinctus is a species of sea snail, a marine gastropod mollusk in the family Horaiclavidae.

It was previously included within the family Turridae.

This is the type species of Cytharoclavus Kuroda & Oyama, 1971

== Description ==
The length of the shell varies between 7 mm and 17 mm. The shell contains 6½ whorls of which 1½ in the protoconch..The aperture is pear-shaped. The siphonal canal is very short and slightly recurved.

The chief marks of distinction are the large apex, the third part of the body whorl near the outer lip lacking the costae, and the very fine reddish spiral lines, the last character existing also in Mangilia costulata, Dunker 1860 (synonym of Cytharella costulata (Dunker, 1860) ), from which it differs in size, the absence of all spiral sculpture, and the character of the ribbing.

== Distribution ==
This marine species occurs off the Philippines, Taiwan and Japan; also in the Mozambique Channel .
