= Horaiclavus stenocyma =

Scientific classification
- Kingdom: Animalia
- Phylum: Mollusca
- Class: Gastropoda
- Subclass: Caenogastropoda
- Order: Neogastropoda
- Superfamily: Conoidea
- Family: Horaiclavidae
- Genus: Horaiclavus
- Species: H. stenocyma

Binomial name
- Horaiclavus stenocyma Kuroda, Habe & Oyama, 1971

Synonyms
- Horaiclavus (Cytharoclavus) stenocyma Kuroda, Habe & Oyama, 1971

Species of gastropod

Horaiclavus stenocyma is a species of sea snail, a marine gastropod mollusk in the family Horaiclavidae.

It was previously included within the family Turridae.

The original figure and description are of little value.

== Distribution ==
This marine species occurs off Japan.
