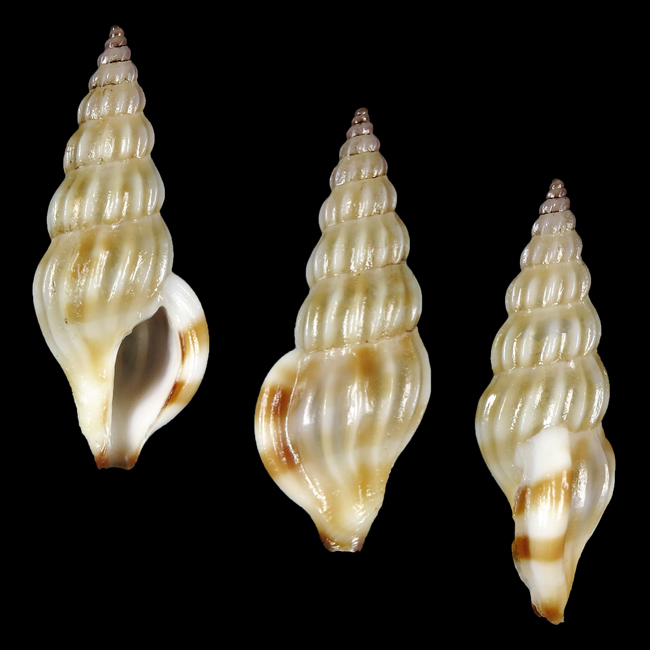

Scientific classification
- Kingdom: Animalia
- Phylum: Mollusca
- Class: Gastropoda
- Subclass: Caenogastropoda
- Order: Neogastropoda
- Family: Horaiclavidae
- Genus: Horaiclavus
- Species: H. julieae

Binomial name
- Horaiclavus julieae Stahlschmidt, Poppe & Tagaro, 2018

= Horaiclavus julieae =

Species of gastropod

Horaiclavus julieae is a species of sea snail, a marine gastropoda mollusc in the family Horaiclavidae.

== Description ==
The length of the shell attains 18.8 mm.

== Distribution ==
This marine species occurs off the Philippines

== Original description ==
- Stahlschmidt P., Poppe G.T. & Tagaro S.P. (2018). Descriptions of remarkable new turrid species from the Philippines. Visaya. 5(1): 5-64. page(s): 30, pl. 23 figs 1-3.
