= Horaiclavus ordinei =

Scientific classification
- Kingdom: Animalia
- Phylum: Mollusca
- Class: Gastropoda
- Subclass: Caenogastropoda
- Order: Neogastropoda
- Superfamily: Conoidea
- Family: Horaiclavidae
- Genus: Horaiclavus
- Species: H. ordinei

Binomial name
- Horaiclavus ordinei Bonfitto & Morassi, 2014

Species of gastropod

Horaiclavus ordinei is a species of sea snail, a marine gastropod mollusk in the family Horaiclavidae.
