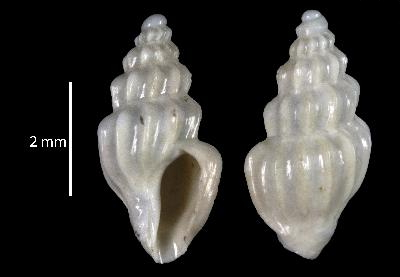
- Shell of Horaiclavus adenensis (holotype in the MNHN, Paris)

Scientific classification
- Kingdom: Animalia
- Phylum: Mollusca
- Class: Gastropoda
- Subclass: Caenogastropoda
- Order: Neogastropoda
- Superfamily: Conoidea
- Family: Horaiclavidae
- Genus: Horaiclavus
- Species: H. adenensis

Binomial name
- Horaiclavus adenensis Bonfitto & Morassi, 2014

= Horaiclavus adenensis =

Species of gastropod

Horaiclavus adenensis is a species of sea snails, a marine gastropod mollusc in the family Horaiclavidae.

== Description ==
The length of the shell attains 4 mm.

== Distribution ==
This marine species occurs off the Gulf of Aden.
