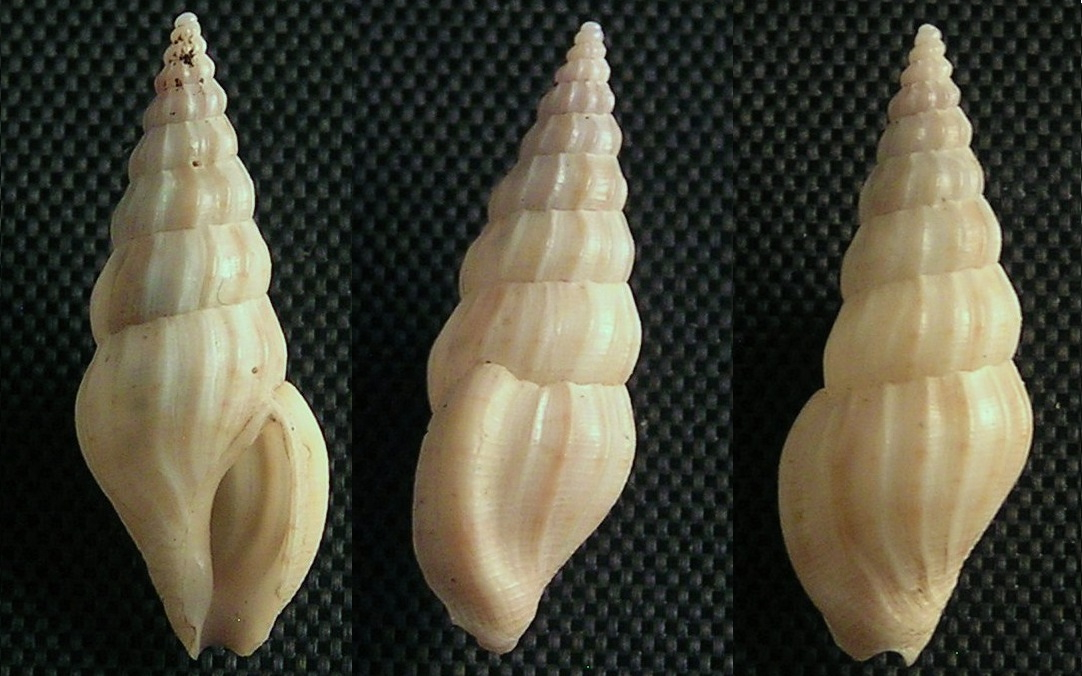
- Three views of a shell of Horaiclavus splendidus

Scientific classification
- Kingdom: Animalia
- Phylum: Mollusca
- Class: Gastropoda
- Subclass: Caenogastropoda
- Order: Neogastropoda
- Superfamily: Conoidea
- Family: Horaiclavidae
- Genus: Horaiclavus
- Species: H. splendidus

Binomial name
- Horaiclavus splendidus (A. Adams, 1867)

Synonyms
- Mangilia splendida Adams A., 1867; Mangelia splendida Adams A., 1867

= Horaiclavus splendidus =

Species of gastropod

Horaiclavus splendidus is a species of sea snail, a marine gastropod mollusk in the family Horaiclavidae.

It was previously included within the family Turridae.

== Description ==
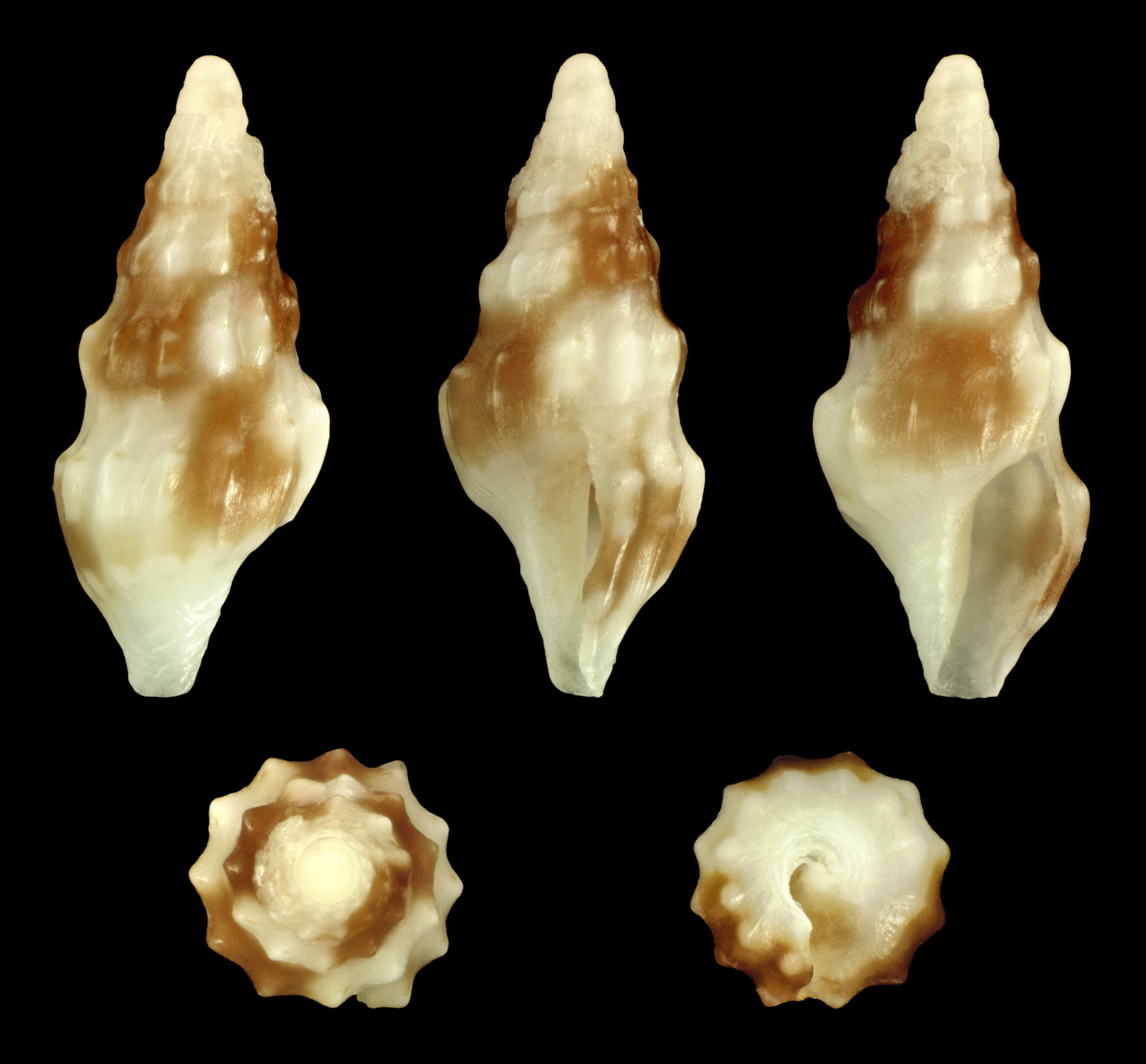
Juvenile

The length of the shell varies between 15 mm and 40 mm.

The shell is somewhat thin, subpellucid and shining. It shows longitudinal, obtuse, unequal, rather weak plicae, and somewhat distant spiral lineations. It is light brownish, with bands of rather large chestnut maculations. The outer lip is acute, but varicose externally.

== Distribution ==
This marine species occurs off the Philippines, Taiwan and Japan
