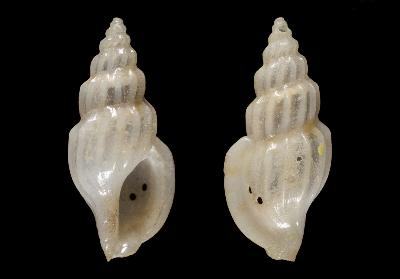
- Shell of Horaiclavus anaimus (holotype in the MNHN, Paris)

Scientific classification
- Kingdom: Animalia
- Phylum: Mollusca
- Class: Gastropoda
- Subclass: Caenogastropoda
- Order: Neogastropoda
- Superfamily: Conoidea
- Family: Horaiclavidae
- Genus: Horaiclavus
- Species: H. anaimus

Binomial name
- Horaiclavus anaimus Sysoev in Fedosov & Kantor, 2008

= Horaiclavus anaimus =

Species of gastropod

Horaiclavus anaimus is a species of sea snail, a marine gastropod mollusk in the family Horaiclavidae.

It was previously included within the family Turridae.

== Description ==
The length of the shell attains 12 mm.

== Distribution ==
This marine species occurs off New Caledonia.
