= Cytharoclavus =

Scientific classification
- Kingdom: Animalia
- Phylum: Mollusca
- Class: Gastropoda
- Subclass: Caenogastropoda
- Order: Neogastropoda
- Superfamily: Conoidea
- Family: Horaiclavidae
- Genus: Cytharoclavus; Kuroda & Oyama, 1971

Type species
- Pleurotoma filicincta E. A. Smith, 1882

Species
- See text

Synonyms
- Horaiclavus (Cytharoclavus) Kuroda & Oyama, 1971

Genus of gastropods

Cytharoclavus is a genus of sea snails, marine gastropod mollusks in the family Horaiclavidae.

It is now considered a subgenus of the genus Horaiclavus.
