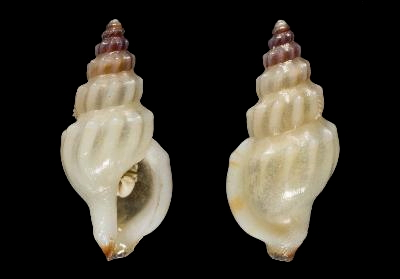
- Shell of Horaiclavus phaeocercus (holotype at MNHN, Paris)

Scientific classification
- Kingdom: Animalia
- Phylum: Mollusca
- Class: Gastropoda
- Subclass: Caenogastropoda
- Order: Neogastropoda
- Superfamily: Conoidea
- Family: Horaiclavidae
- Genus: Horaiclavus
- Species: H. phaeocercus

Binomial name
- Horaiclavus phaeocercus Sysoev in Fedosov & Kantor, 2008

= Horaiclavus phaeocercus =

Species of gastropod

Horaiclavus phaeocercus is a species of sea snail, a marine gastropod mollusk in the family Horaiclavidae.

== Description ==
The length of the shell attains 11 mm and is in a spiral shape which is a trait all members of its Genus share. The way to tell Horaiclavus Phaeocercus apart from other members of its genus is its distinct dark brown upper part of the shell. The shells apex however turns back to the light tan color of the rest of its shell and has a dull point.

== Distribution ==
This marine species occurs off New Caledonia
