= Horaiclavus sysoevi =

Scientific classification
- Kingdom: Animalia
- Phylum: Mollusca
- Class: Gastropoda
- Subclass: Caenogastropoda
- Order: Neogastropoda
- Superfamily: Conoidea
- Family: Horaiclavidae
- Genus: Horaiclavus
- Species: H. sysoevi

Binomial name
- Horaiclavus sysoevi Smriglio & Mariottini, 2003

Species of gastropod

Horaiclavus sysoevi is a species of sea snail, a marine gastropod mollusk in the family Horaiclavidae.

Originally it was classified within the family Drilliidae. Later it was included within the family Turridae.

== Distribution ==
This species occurs in the Northwest Indian Ocean.
