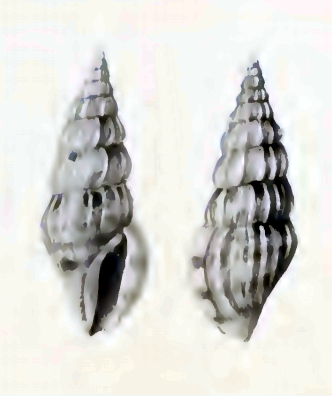
- Original image of a shell of Horaiclavus madurensis

Scientific classification
- Kingdom: Animalia
- Phylum: Mollusca
- Class: Gastropoda
- Subclass: Caenogastropoda
- Order: Neogastropoda
- Superfamily: Conoidea
- Family: Horaiclavidae
- Genus: Horaiclavus
- Species: H. madurensis

Binomial name
- Horaiclavus madurensis (Schepman, 1913)

Synonyms
- Drillia madurensis Schepman, 1913

= Horaiclavus madurensis =

Species of gastropod

Horaiclavus madurensis is a species of sea snail, a marine gastropod mollusk in the family Horaiclavidae.

It was previously included within the family Turridae.

== Description ==
The length of the shell varies between 20 mm and 30 mm.

(Original description) The shell is shortly fusiform, rather smooth, light buff, with a few red-brown spots below the suture of lower whorls and one faint band on those whorls and 3 on the body whorl, the siphonal canal being tinted with the same colour. The shell contains 9 whorls, of which 2 upper ones form a smooth, convexly-whorled nucleus. The subsequent whorls are convex, 4 or 5 post-nuclear ones slightly angular below, lower ones becoming more regularly convex. The sculpture consists of numerous, rather narrow, axial ribs, about 20 stronger and weaker ones on the body whorl, that behind the peristome very strong and varix-like; these ribs run from one suture to the other on upper whorls, but are faint towards the base of body whorl, and disappear on the siphonal canal, which is spirally lirate. The upper part of the whorls is very faintly spirally striated. The aperture is ovate, with an angle above, but scarcely with a sinus. The peristome is thin, slightly curved. The columellar margin is tubercled above, then regularly concave and conspicuously enamelled. The aperture ends in a short, wide siphonal canal. The interior of the aperture shows a white layer of enamel near peristome and 3 brown blotches at its margin, corresponding to the external bands.

== Distribution ==
This marine species occurs off Madura Island, Indonesia.
