= Horaiclavus kilburni =

Scientific classification
- Kingdom: Animalia
- Phylum: Mollusca
- Class: Gastropoda
- Subclass: Caenogastropoda
- Order: Neogastropoda
- Superfamily: Conoidea
- Family: Horaiclavidae
- Genus: Horaiclavus
- Species: H. kilburni

Binomial name
- Horaiclavus kilburni Stahlschmidt, 2015

Species of gastropod

Horaiclavus kilburni is a species of sea snail, a marine gastropod mollusc in the family Horaiclavidae.

== Distribution ==
This marine species occurs off the Province of the Eastern Cape, South Africa.
