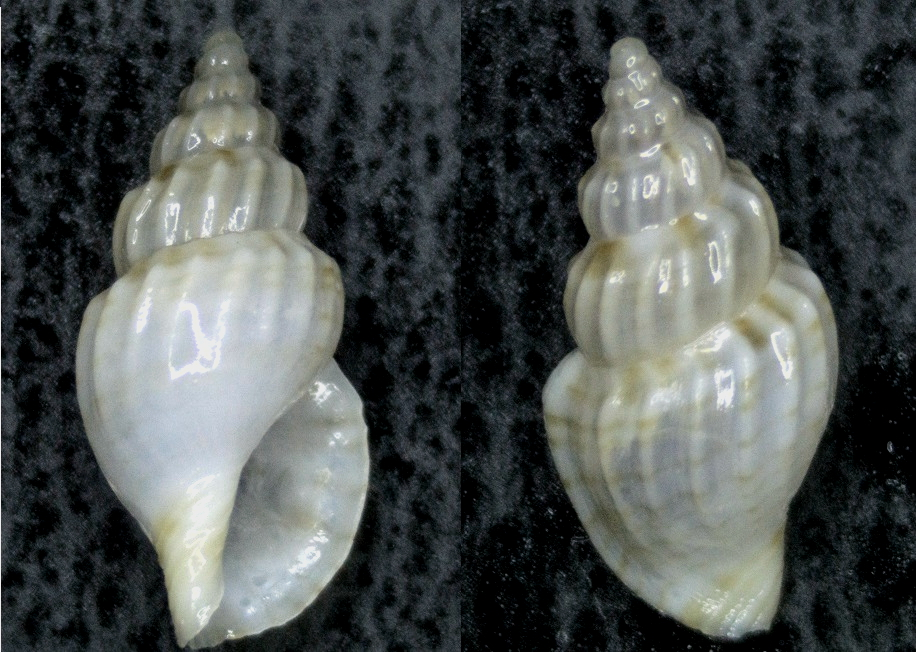
- Two views of a shell of Horaiclavus filicinctus

Scientific classification
- Kingdom: Animalia
- Phylum: Mollusca
- Class: Gastropoda
- Subclass: Caenogastropoda
- Order: Neogastropoda
- Superfamily: Conoidea
- Family: Horaiclavidae
- Genus: Horaiclavus; Oyama, 1954

Type species
- Mangelia splendida A. Adams, 1867

Species
- See text

Synonyms
- Horaiclavus (Cytharoclavus) Kuroda & Oyama, 1971· accepted, alternate representation

= Horaiclavus =

Genus of gastropods

Horaiclavus is a genus of sea snails, marine gastropod mollusks in the family Horaiclavidae.

Horaiclavus is the type genus of the family Horaiclavidae.

It was previously included within the subfamily Crassispirinae, family Turridae.

== Species ==
Species within the genus Horaiclavus include:

- Horaiclavus adenensis Bonfitto & Morassi, 2014
- Horaiclavus anaimus Sysoev in Fedosov & Kantor, 2008
- Horaiclavus filicinctus (Smith E. A., 1882)
- Horaiclavus julieae Stahlschmidt, Poppe & Tagaro, 2018
- Horaiclavus kilburni Stahlschmidt, 2015
- † Horaiclavus madiunensis (K. Martin, 1906)
- Horaiclavus madurensis (Schepman, 1913)
- Horaiclavus micans Kantor, Fedosov & Puillandre, 2018
- Horaiclavus ordinei Bonfitto & Morassi, 2014
- † Horaiclavus oyamai K. Masuda & H. Noda, 1976
- Horaiclavus phaeocercus Sysoev in Fedosov & Kantor, 2008
- Horaiclavus pulchellus Stahlschmidt, Poppe & Tagaro, 2018
- Horaiclavus splendidus (Adams A., 1867)
- Horaiclavus stenocyma Kuroda, Habe & Oyama, 1971
- Horaiclavus sysoevi Smriglio & Mariottini, 2003

Species brought into synonymy

- Horaiclavus multicostatus (Schepman, 1913): synonym of Anguloclavus multicostatus (Schepman, 1913)
