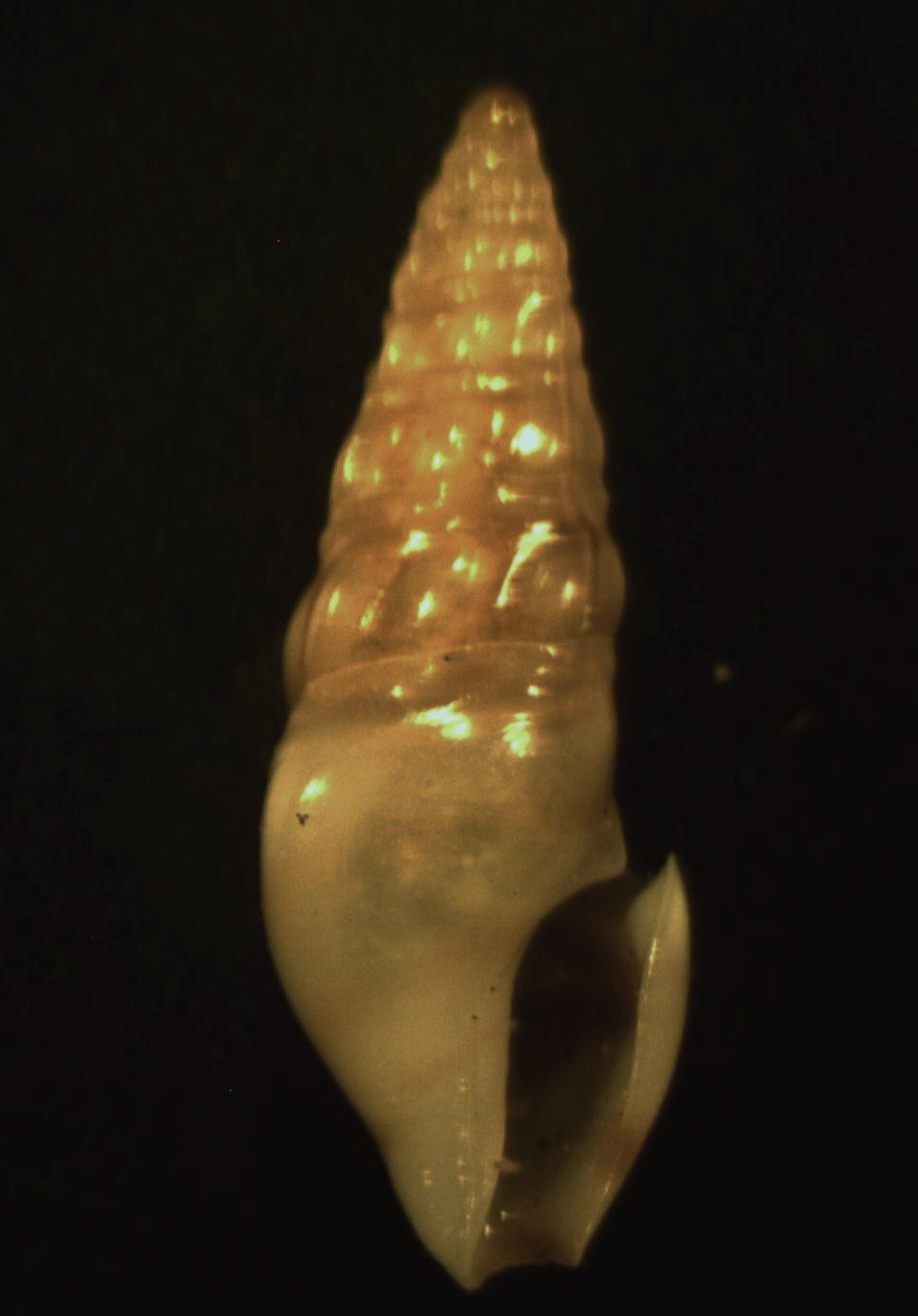
- Apertural view of a shell of Splendrillia aurora

Scientific classification
- Kingdom: Animalia
- Phylum: Mollusca
- Class: Gastropoda
- Subclass: Caenogastropoda
- Order: Neogastropoda
- Superfamily: Conoidea
- Family: Drilliidae
- Genus: Splendrillia; Hedley, 1922

Type species
- Drillia woodsi Beddome, 1883

Species
- See text

= Splendrillia =

Genus of gastropods

Splendrillia is a genus of sea snails, marine gastropod mollusks in the family Drilliidae.

Fossils from this old genus have been found in Eocene strata of Antarctica, Oligocene and Miocene strata of Australia, Miocene strata of Germany, Japan and New Zealand and Quaternary strata of the United States; age range: 55.8 to 0.012 Ma.

== Species ==
Species within the genus Splendrillia include:

- Splendrillia abdita Fallon, 2016
- Splendrillia academica McLean & Poorman, 1971
- Splendrillia acostata (Verco, 1909)
- † Splendrillia adelaidae (A. W. B. Powell, 1944)
- † Splendrillia aequistriata (Hutton, 1886)
- † Splendrillia afflicta (Marwick, 1931)
- Splendrillia alabastrum Kilburn, 1988
- Splendrillia albicans (Hinds, 1843)
- Splendrillia alticostata Fallon, 2016
- Splendrillia angularia Wells, 1995
- † Splendrillia annectens Powell, 1942
- † Splendrillia anomala Powell, 1942
- Splendrillia aomoriensis (Nomura & Hatai, 1940)
- Splendrillia aoteana Finlay H. J., 1930
- Splendrillia arga McLean & Poorman, 1971
- Splendrillia armata Powell, 1942
- Splendrillia aurora (Thiele, 1925)
- Splendrillia bahamasensis Fallon, 2016
- Splendrillia bartschi (Haas, 1941)
- Splendrillia basilirata Sysoev, 1990
- Splendrillia bednalli (Sowerby III, 1896)
- Splendrillia benthicola Dell, 1956
- Splendrillia biconica (N.E. Weisbord, 1962)
- Splendrillia boucheti Wells, 1995
- Splendrillia bozzettii Stahlschmidt, Poppe & Tagaro, 2018
- Splendrillia bratcherae McLean & Poorman, 1971
- Splendrillia braunsi M. Yokoyama, 1920
- Splendrillia brycei Wells, 1995
- Splendrillia buicki Wells, 1990
- Splendrillia campbellensis Sysoev & Kantor, 1989
- Splendrillia candidula (Hedley, 1922)
- Splendrillia carolae Wells, 1995
- Splendrillia chathamensis Sysoev & Kantor, 1989
- † Splendrillia clava Powell, 1942
- † Splendrillia clifdenensis Powell, 1942
- Splendrillia clydonia (Melvill & Standen, 1901)
- Splendrillia coccinata (Reeve, 1845)
- Splendrillia compta Fallon, 2016
- Splendrillia crassiplicata (Kuroda, Habe & Oyama, 1971)
- † Splendrillia cristata Powell, 1942
- Splendrillia cruzensis Fallon, 2016
- Splendrillia daviesi Kilburn, 1988
- Splendrillia debilis Finlay H. J., 1927
- Splendrillia disjecta (Smith E. A., 1888)
- Splendrillia dissimilis Fallon, 2016
- Splendrillia eburnea (Hedley, 1922)
- † Splendrillia edita Powell, 1942
- Splendrillia elongata Wells, 1995: homonym but not synonym of † Splendrillia elongata Beu, 1970
- † Splendrillia elongata Beu, 1970
- Splendrillia espyra (Woodring, 1928)
- Splendrillia eva (Thiele, 1925)
- Splendrillia falsa (Barnard, 1958)
- † Splendrillia formosa (A. W. B. Powell, 1944)
- † Splendrillia filiculosa (Marwick, 1931)
- Splendrillia flavopunctata Fallon, 2016
- Splendrillia globosa Wells, 1995
- Splendrillia granatella (Melvill & Standen, 1903)
- Splendrillia grandis Fallon, 2016
- Splendrillia gratiosa (Sowerby III, 1896)
- Splendrillia hansenae Wells, 1990
- Splendrillia hayesi Kilburn, 1998
- Splendrillia hedleyi Wells, 1990
- Splendrillia hermata Dell, 1956
- Splendrillia houbricki Wells, 1995
- Splendrillia intermaculata (Smith E. A., 1879)
- Splendrillia intermedia Wells, 1995
- Splendrillia interpunctata (E. A. Smith, 1882)
- Splendrillia jacula Dell, 1956
- Splendrillia jarosae Wells, 1991
- Splendrillia kapuranga Dell, 1953
- Splendrillia karukeraensis Fallon, 2016
- Splendrillia kingmai Marwick, 1965
- † Splendrillia koruahinensis (Bartrum & Powell, 1928)
- Splendrillia kylix Kilburn, 1988
- † Splendrillia laevissima Lozouet, 2017 †
- Splendrillia lalage (Dall, 1919)
- Splendrillia larochei Powell, 1940
- † Splendrillia lincta Powell, 1942
- Splendrillia longbottomi Wells, 1990
- Splendrillia lucida (Nevill & Nevill, 1875)
- Splendrillia lygdina (Hedley, 1922)
- Splendrillia majorina Beu, 1979
- † Splendrillia marconensis Lozouet, 2017
- Splendrillia masinoi Fallon, 2016
- Splendrillia mikrokamelos Kilburn, 1988
- Splendrillia minima Wells, 1995
- Splendrillia nenia (Hedley, 1903)
- Splendrillia obscura Sysoev, 1990
- Splendrillia otagoensis Powell, 1942
- Splendrillia panamensis Fallon, 2016
- Splendrillia persica (Smith E. A., 1888)
- Splendrillia powelli Wells, 1990 (junior homonym of † Splendrillia powelli (L. C. King, 1934) -a replacement name will be published)
- † Splendrillia powelli (L. C. King, 1934)
- Splendrillia praeclara (Melvill, 1893)
- Splendrillia praeclara (Sowerby III, 1915) (junior homonym of Splendrillia praeclara (Melvill, 1893) - a replacement name will be published)
- Splendrillia problematica Wells, 1995
- Splendrillia raricostata (Smith E. A., 1879)
- Splendrillia resplendens (Melvill, 1898)
- Splendrillia roseacincta Dell, 1956
- Splendrillia runcinata Dell, 1956
- Splendrillia sarda Kilburn, 1988
- Splendrillia skambos Kilburn, 1988
- Splendrillia solicitata (Sowerby III, 1913)
- Splendrillia spadicina (Hedley, 1922)
- Splendrillia stegeri (Nowell-Usticke, 1959)
- Splendrillia stellae Fallon, 2016
- Splendrillia striata Wells, 1995
- † Splendrillia subspinifera Lozouet, 2017
- Splendrillia subtilis Fallon, 2016
- Splendrillia subviridis (May, 1911)
- Splendrillia suluensis (Schepman, 1913)
- Splendrillia taylori Wells, 1995
- Splendrillia triconica Wells, 1995
- Splendrillia turrita (Wells, 1995)
- Splendrillia vinki (De Jong & Coomans, 1988)
- Splendrillia wayae Wells, 1995
- Splendrillia westralis Wells, 1993
- † Splendrillia whangaimoana Vella, 1954
- Splendrillia woodsi (Beddome, 1883)
- Splendrillia zanzibarica Sysoev, 1996
- Splendrillia zeobliqua Beu, 1979

Species brought into synonymy

- Splendrillia agasma B.C. Cotton, 1947: synonym of Splendrillia woodsi (R.H. Beddome, 1883)
- Splendrillia ansonae F.E. Wells, 1990: synonym of Crassispira ansonae F.E. Wells, 1990
- Splendrillia baileyi S.S. Berry, 1969: synonym of Splendrillia lalage (W.H. Dall, 1919)
- Splendrillia carolinae (Bartsch, 1934): synonym of Syntomodrillia carolinae Bartsch, 1934
- Splendrillia dampieria (Hedley, 1922): synonym of Inquisitor dampieria (Hedley, 1922)
- Splendrillia fucata (Reeve, 1845): synonym of Fenimorea fucata (Reeve, 1845)
- Splendrillia halidorema (Schwengel, 1940): synonym of Decoradrillia pulchella (Reeve, 1845)
- Splendrillia hosoi (Okutani, 1964): synonym of Crassispira hosoi (Okutani, 1964)
- Splendrillia howitti G.B. Pritchard & J.H. Gatliff, 1899: synonym of Splendrillia woodsi (R.H. Beddome, 1883)
- Splendrillia hypsela (Watson, 1881): synonym of Syntomodrillia hypsela (Watson, 1881)
- Splendrillia innocens J.C. Melvill, 1923: synonym of Splendrillia coccinata (L.A. Reeve, 1845)
- Splendrillia janetae (Barnard, 1934): synonym of Fenimorea janetae Bartsch, 1934
- Splendrillia laeta (Hinds, 1843): synonym of Clavus laetus (Hinds, 1843)
- Splendrillia laevis F.W. Hutton, 1873: synonym of Splendrillia aoteana H.J. Finlay, 1930
- Splendrillia laevis H.H. Suter, 1908: synonym of Splendrillia debilis H.J. Finlay, 1927
- Splendrillia lissotropis (Dall, 1881): synonym of Syntomodrillia lissotropis (Dall, 1881)
- Splendrillia molleri C.F. Laseron, 1954: synonym of Splendrillia woodsi (R.H. Beddome, 1883)
- Splendrillia moseri (Dall, 1889): synonym of Fenimorea moseri (Dall, 1889)
- Splendrillia nodosa G.W. Nowell-Usticke, 1969: synonym of Splendrillia coccinata (L.A. Reeve, 1845)
- Splendrillia paria L.A. Reeve, 1846: synonym of Fenimorea fucata (L.A. Reeve, 1845)
- Splendrillia quisqualis J.W. Brazier, 1876: synonym of Splendrillia candidula (C. Hedley, 1922)
- Splendrillia stricta MANCA Wells: synonym of Splendrillia striata F.E. Wells, 1995
- Splendrillia sunderlandi Petuch, 1987: synonym of Fenimorea sunderlandi (Petuch, 1987)
- Splendrillia tantula (Bartsch, 1934): synonym of Syntomodrillia portoricana Fallon, 2016
- Splendrillia vivens (Powell, 1942): synonym of Hauturua vivens (Powell, 1942)
- Splendrillia weldiana J.E. Tenison-Woods, 1876: synonym of Fenimorea fucata (L.A. Reeve, 1845)
- Splendrillia woodringi (Bartsch, 1934): synonym of Syntomodrillia woodringi Bartsch, 1934

== Bibliography ==
- Hedley, Charles. A revision of the Australian Turridae. Vol. 13. 1922.
- Sysoev, A. V., and Yu I. Kantor. "Anatomy of molluscs of genus Splendrillia (Gastropoda: Toxoglossa: Turridae) with descriptions of two new bathyal species of the genus from New Zealand." New Zealand Journal of Zoology 16.2 (1989): 205-214.
- FE Wells, Revision of the Recent Australian Turridae referred to the genera Splendrillia and Austrodrillia, Journal of the Malacological Society of Australia, 1990
- Wells, F.E. (1995). A revision of the drilliid genera Splendrillia and Plagiostropha (Gastropoda: Conoidea) from New Caledonia, with additional records from other areas, in: Bouchet, P. (Ed.) (1995). Résultats des campagnes MUSORSTOM: 14. Mémoires du Muséum national d'histoire naturelle. Série A, Zoologie, 167: pp. 527–556
- Fallon, P.J. (2016). "Taxonomic review of tropical western Atlantic shallow water Drilliidae (Mollusca: Gastropoda: Conoidea) including descriptions of 100 new species". Zootaxa. 4090 (1): 1–363.
