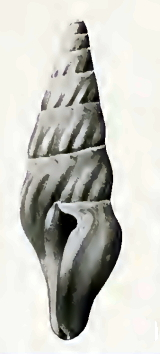
- Original image of a shell of Splendrillia spadicina

Scientific classification
- Kingdom: Animalia
- Phylum: Mollusca
- Class: Gastropoda
- Subclass: Caenogastropoda
- Order: Neogastropoda
- Superfamily: Conoidea
- Family: Drilliidae
- Genus: Splendrillia
- Species: S. spadicina

Binomial name
- Splendrillia spadicina (Hedley, 1922)

Synonyms
- Melatoma spadicina Hedley, 1922

= Splendrillia spadicina =

Species of gastropod

Splendrillia spadicina is a species of sea snail, a marine gastropod mollusk in the family Drilliidae.

== Description ==
The length of the shell attains 25 mm, its diameter 8 mm.

(Original description) The large, solid shell has an elongate-conic shape and is regularly tapering. Its colour is cinnamonbrown. The shell contains 10 whorls . The suture is linear. Below the suture runs an elevated spiral cord. In the intervals between the ribs and on the base are fine spiral threads. The fasciole area is excavate, ornamented with fine spiral threads crossed by concentric strife. The ribs are fourteen to a whorl, oblique, round-backed, commencing below the fasciole and vanishing on the base. The aperture is pyriform. The insertion of lip starts ascending above the plane of the suture, and is supported by a prominent callus knob. The inner lip shows a smear of callus. The sinus is rather wide and shallow. The siphonal canal is short and open.

== Distribution ==
This marine species is endemic to Australia and occurs off New South Wales.
