= Splendrillia praeclara =

Scientific classification
- Kingdom: Animalia
- Phylum: Mollusca
- Class: Gastropoda
- Subclass: Caenogastropoda
- Order: Neogastropoda
- Superfamily: Conoidea
- Family: Drilliidae
- Genus: Splendrillia
- Species: S. praeclara

Binomial name
- Splendrillia praeclara (Melvill, 1893)

Synonyms
- Pleurotoma (Clavus) praeclara Melvill, 1893 (basionym); Pleurotoma praeclara Melvill, 1893 (original combination)

Species of gastropod

Splendrillia praeclara is a species of sea snail, a marine gastropod mollusk in the family Drilliidae.

== Distribution ==
This marine species occurs off Western India.
