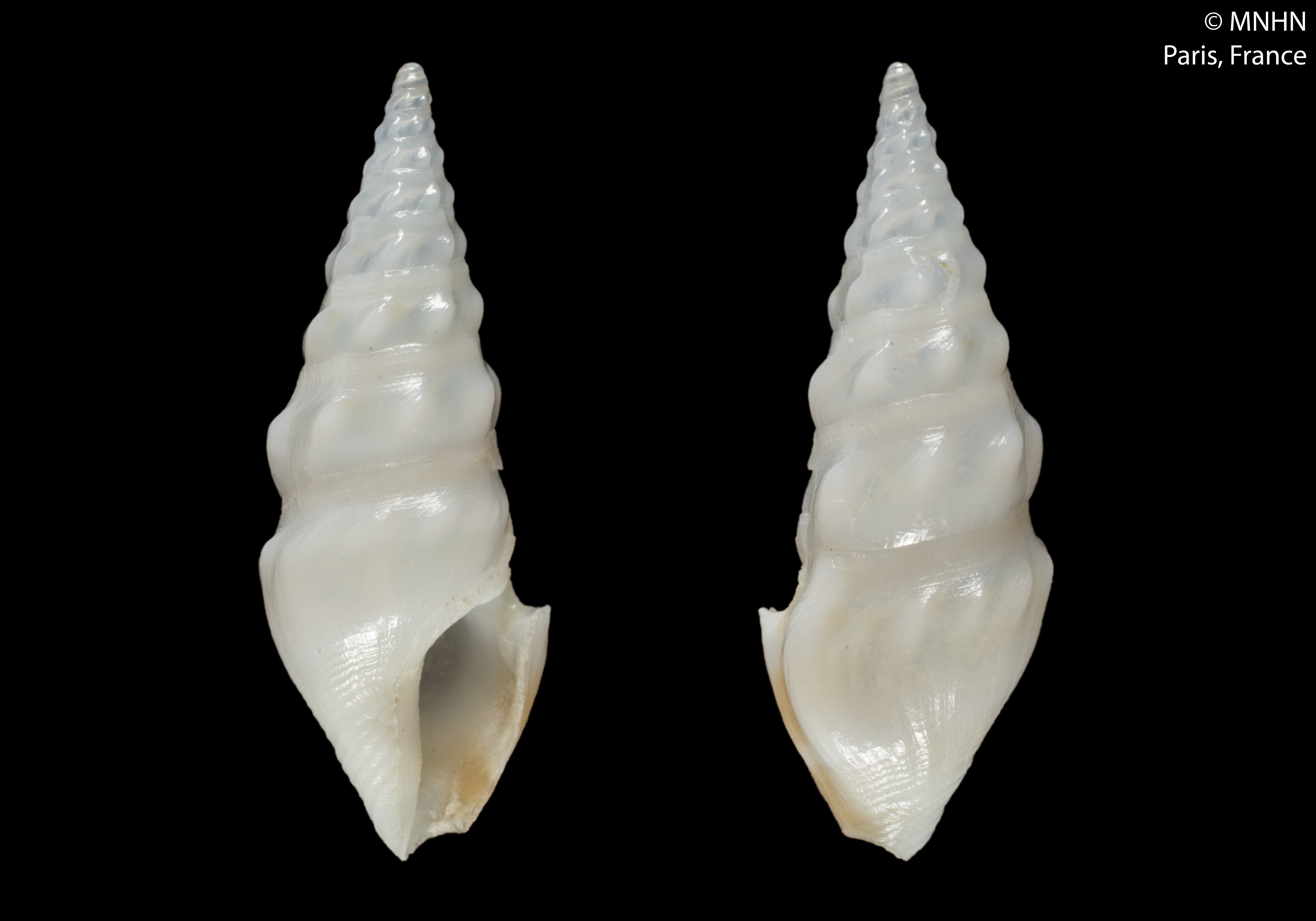
- Shell of Splendrillia taylori (holotype at MNHN, Paris)

Scientific classification
- Kingdom: Animalia
- Phylum: Mollusca
- Class: Gastropoda
- Subclass: Caenogastropoda
- Order: Neogastropoda
- Superfamily: Conoidea
- Family: Drilliidae
- Genus: Splendrillia
- Species: S. taylori

Binomial name
- Splendrillia taylori Wells, 1995

= Splendrillia taylori =

Species of gastropod

Splendrillia taylori is a species of sea snail, a marine gastropod mollusk in the family Drilliidae.

== Description ==
The length of the shell attains 15.1 mm.

== Distribution ==
This marine species occurs off New Caledonia.
