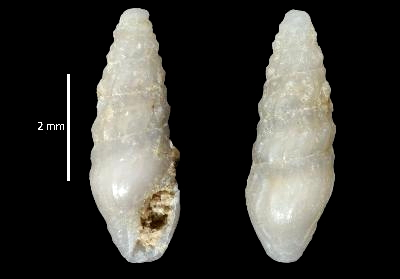
- Shell of Splendrillia longbottomi (paratype at MNHN, Paris)

Scientific classification
- Kingdom: Animalia
- Phylum: Mollusca
- Class: Gastropoda
- Subclass: Caenogastropoda
- Order: Neogastropoda
- Superfamily: Conoidea
- Family: Drilliidae
- Genus: Splendrillia
- Species: S. longbottomi

Binomial name
- Splendrillia longbottomi Wells, 1990

= Splendrillia longbottomi =

Species of gastropod

Splendrillia longbottomi is a species of sea snail, a marine gastropod mollusk in the family Drilliidae.

== Distribution ==
This marine species is endemic to Australia and occurs off Western Australia.
