= Splendrillia hansenae =

Scientific classification
- Kingdom: Animalia
- Phylum: Mollusca
- Class: Gastropoda
- Subclass: Caenogastropoda
- Order: Neogastropoda
- Superfamily: Conoidea
- Family: Drilliidae
- Genus: Splendrillia
- Species: S. hansenae

Binomial name
- Splendrillia hansenae Wells, 1990

Species of gastropod

Splendrillia hansenae is a species of sea snail, a marine gastropod mollusk in the family Drilliidae.

== Distribution ==
This marine species is endemic to Australia and occurs off Western Australia.
