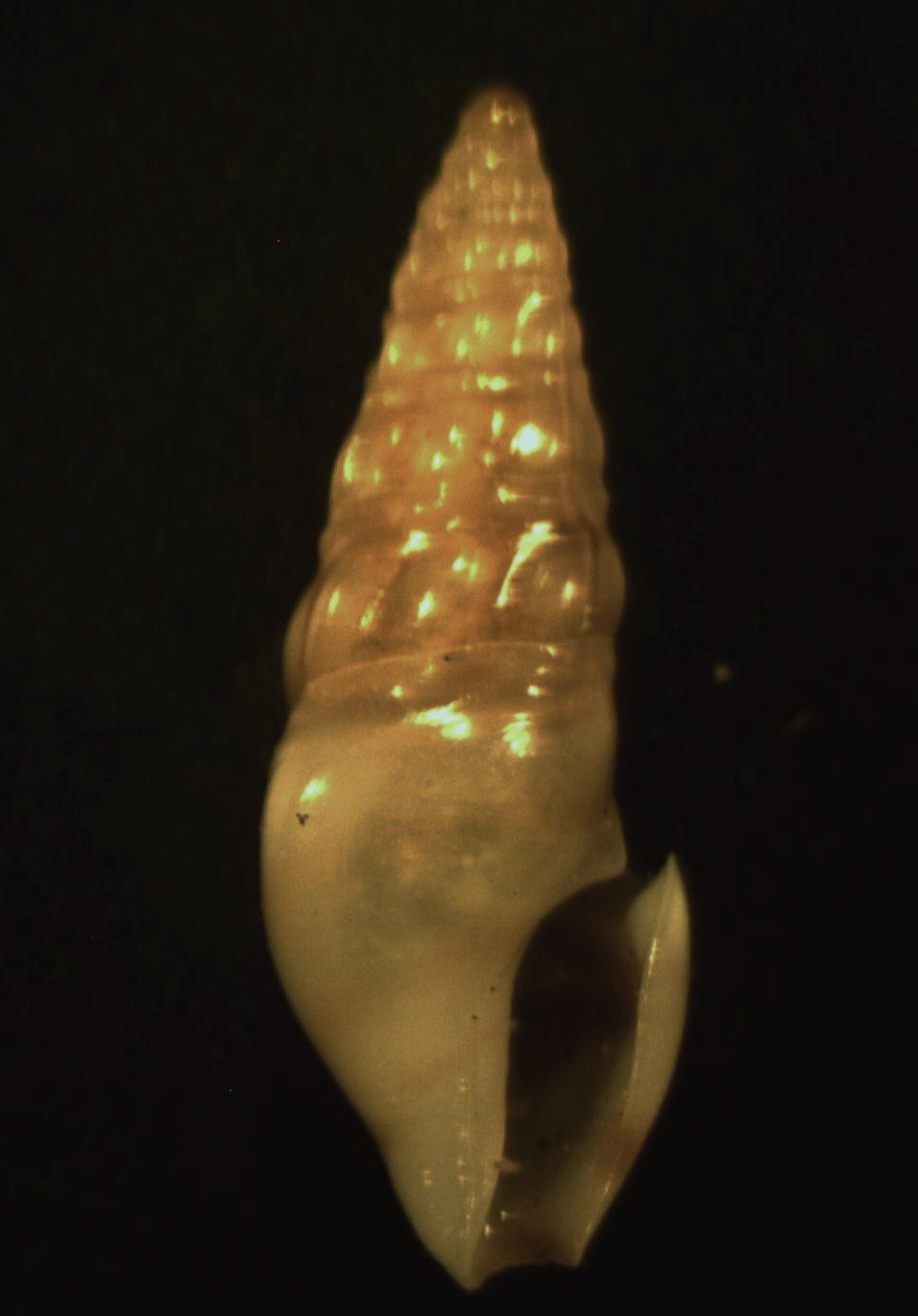
- Apertural view of a shell of Splendrillia aurora

Scientific classification
- Kingdom: Animalia
- Phylum: Mollusca
- Class: Gastropoda
- Subclass: Caenogastropoda
- Order: Neogastropoda
- Superfamily: Conoidea
- Family: Drilliidae
- Genus: Splendrillia
- Species: S. aurora

Binomial name
- Splendrillia aurora (Thiele, 1925)

Synonyms
- Drillia aurora Thiele, 1925 (basionym); Elaeocyma (Splendrillia) aurora (Thiele, 1925)

= Splendrillia aurora =

Species of gastropod

Splendrillia aurora is a species of sea snail, a marine gastropod mollusk in the family Drilliidae.

== Description ==
The length of the shell attains 9 mm.

== Distribution ==
This species occurs in the demersal zone off Sumatra, Indonesia and off the Philippines.
