= Splendrillia biconica =

Scientific classification
- Kingdom: Animalia
- Phylum: Mollusca
- Class: Gastropoda
- Subclass: Caenogastropoda
- Order: Neogastropoda
- Superfamily: Conoidea
- Family: Drilliidae
- Genus: Splendrillia
- Species: S. biconica

Binomial name
- Splendrillia biconica (Weisbord, 1962)

Synonyms
- Syntomodrillia? biconica Weisbord, 1962

Species of gastropod

Splendrillia biconica is a species of sea snail, a marine gastropod mollusc in the family Drilliidae.

== Description ==
The length of the shell attains 18.6 mm.

== Distribution ==
This marine species was found in the Lower Mare formation on Isla Margarita, Venezuela. It was described as a fossil. It was also found in the eastern part of Panama.
