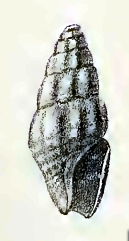
- Original image of a shell of Splendrillia granatella

Scientific classification
- Kingdom: Animalia
- Phylum: Mollusca
- Class: Gastropoda
- Subclass: Caenogastropoda
- Order: Neogastropoda
- Superfamily: Conoidea
- Family: Drilliidae
- Genus: Splendrillia
- Species: S. granatella

Binomial name
- Splendrillia granatella (Melvill & Standen, 1903)

Synonyms
- Drillia granatella Melvill & Standen, 1903

= Splendrillia granatella =

Species of gastropod

Splendrillia granatella is a species of sea snail, a marine gastropod mollusk in the family Drilliidae.

== Description ==
The length of the shell attains 5 mm, its diameter 1.5 mm.

It is a smooth, shining, fusiform shell of pomegranate-pink color. It contains 6 whorls, of which two in the protoconch. The sculpture consists of few ribs, numbering 7 close to the body whorl. The aperture is slightly ovate. The white-colored outer lip is thin..The sinus is wide. The siphonal canal is very short.

== Distribution ==
This marine species occurs in the Persian Gulf and the Gulf of Oman.
