= Splendrillia jarosae =

Scientific classification
- Kingdom: Animalia
- Phylum: Mollusca
- Class: Gastropoda
- Subclass: Caenogastropoda
- Order: Neogastropoda
- Superfamily: Conoidea
- Family: Drilliidae
- Genus: Splendrillia
- Species: S. jarosae

Binomial name
- Splendrillia jarosae Wells, 1991

Species of gastropod

Splendrillia jarosae is a species of sea snail, a marine gastropod mollusk in the family Drilliidae.
