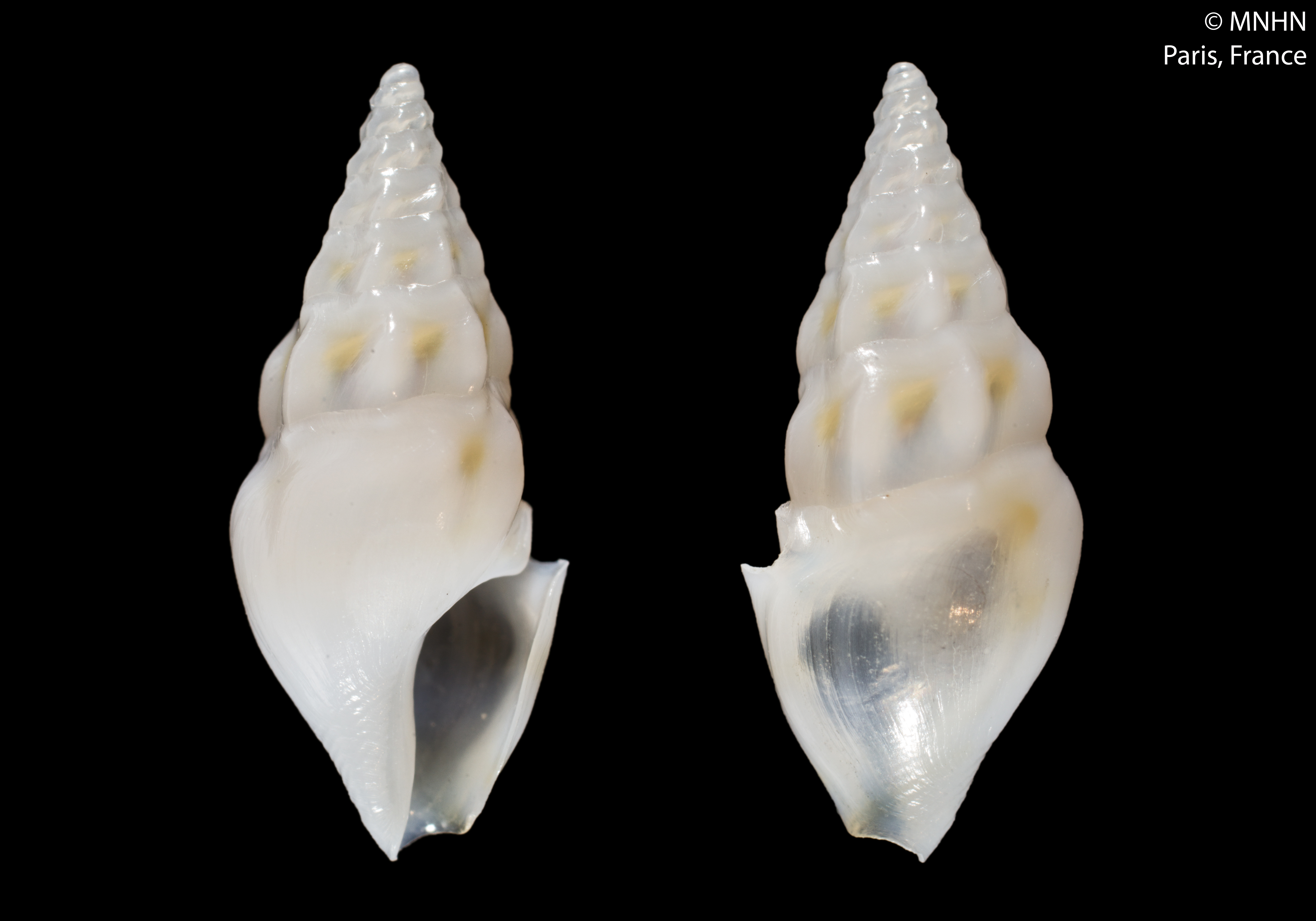
- Shell of Splendrillia intermedia (holotype at MNHN, Paris)

Scientific classification
- Kingdom: Animalia
- Phylum: Mollusca
- Class: Gastropoda
- Subclass: Caenogastropoda
- Order: Neogastropoda
- Superfamily: Conoidea
- Family: Drilliidae
- Genus: Splendrillia
- Species: S. intermedia

Binomial name
- Splendrillia intermedia Wells, 1995

= Splendrillia intermedia =

Species of gastropod

Splendrillia intermedia is a species of sea snail, a marine gastropod mollusk in the family Drilliidae.

== Distribution ==
This marine species occurs in the Western Indian Ocean in the Mozambique Channel and off New Caledonia.
