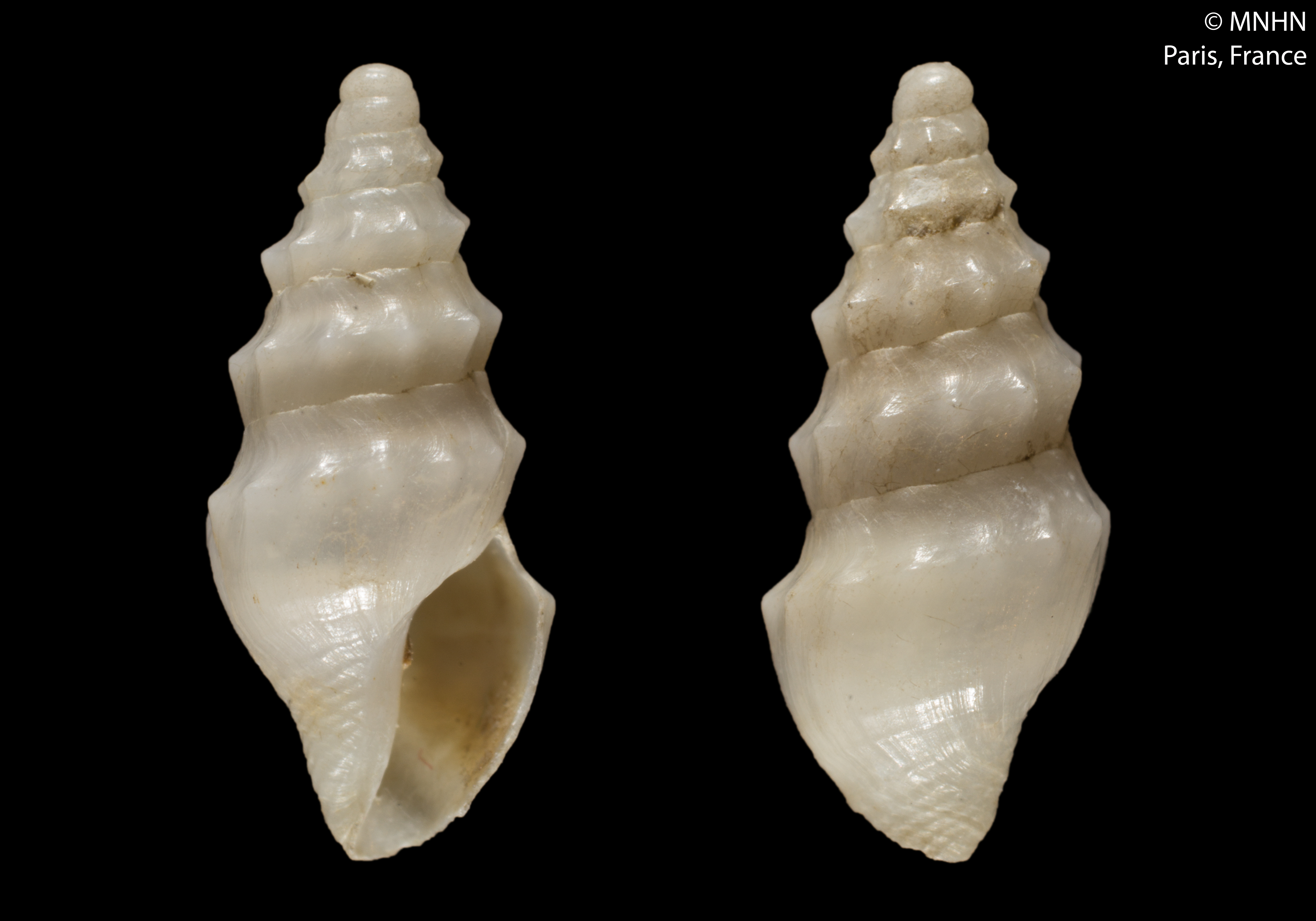
- Shell of Splendrillia angularia (holotype at MNHN, Paris)

Scientific classification
- Kingdom: Animalia
- Phylum: Mollusca
- Class: Gastropoda
- Subclass: Caenogastropoda
- Order: Neogastropoda
- Superfamily: Conoidea
- Family: Drilliidae
- Genus: Splendrillia
- Species: S. angularia

Binomial name
- Splendrillia angularia Wells, 1995

= Splendrillia angularia =

Species of gastropod

Splendrillia angularia is a species of sea snail, a marine gastropod mollusk in the family Drilliidae.

== Distribution ==
This species occurs in the demersal zone of the Pacific Ocean off New Caledonia at a depth of 720 m.
