= Splendrillia zanzibarica =

Scientific classification
- Kingdom: Animalia
- Phylum: Mollusca
- Class: Gastropoda
- Subclass: Caenogastropoda
- Order: Neogastropoda
- Superfamily: Conoidea
- Family: Drilliidae
- Genus: Splendrillia
- Species: S. zanzibarica

Binomial name
- Splendrillia zanzibarica Sysoev, 1996

Species of gastropod

Splendrillia zanzibarica is a species of sea snail, a marine gastropod mollusk in the family Drilliidae.

== Description ==
The height of the shell attains 19.3 mm, its diameter is 8.1 mm.

== Distribution ==
This marine species occurs off Zanzibar.
