= Splendrillia espyra =

Scientific classification
- Kingdom: Animalia
- Phylum: Mollusca
- Class: Gastropoda
- Subclass: Caenogastropoda
- Order: Neogastropoda
- Superfamily: Conoidea
- Family: Drilliidae
- Genus: Splendrillia
- Species: S. espyra

Binomial name
- Splendrillia espyra (Woodring W.P., 1928)

Species of gastropod

Splendrillia espyra is a species of sea snail, a marine gastropod mollusk in the family Drilliidae.

== Description ==
The length of the shell varies between 5 mm and 8 mm. The shell contains one and a half to two and a half smooth whorls, with the nucleus of the whorls bulging slightly towards the anterior edge. The columella of the shell has fine spiral threads. The number of whorls and size of the whorls were noted to vary between each individual specimen.

== Distribution ==
This marine species occurs off Eastern Brazil.
