= Splendrillia mikrokamelos =

Scientific classification
- Kingdom: Animalia
- Phylum: Mollusca
- Class: Gastropoda
- Subclass: Caenogastropoda
- Order: Neogastropoda
- Superfamily: Conoidea
- Family: Drilliidae
- Genus: Splendrillia
- Species: S. mikrokamelos

Binomial name
- Splendrillia mikrokamelos Kilburn, 1988

Species of gastropod

Splendrillia mikrokamelos is a species of sea snail, a marine gastropod mollusk in the family Drilliidae.

== Description ==
The small claviform shell has a length of 6.2 mm, its diameter 2.6 mm. The vitreous protoconch is very small and consists of 1½ whorl (breadth ca 0,75 mm), the teleoconch contains 5 whorls.. The axial ribs are strong (with 9 ribs on the penultimate whorl). The body whorl has an inverted cone shape and its dorsum is prominently humped. The short siphonal canal is narrow and twisted slightly to the right. The aperture is narrowly pear-shaped. The outer lip is somewhat flattened in the middle. The columella is almost straight.

== Distribution ==
This marine species occurs off the upper continental slope of Transkei, South Africa.
