= Splendrillia kingmai =

Scientific classification
- Kingdom: Animalia
- Phylum: Mollusca
- Class: Gastropoda
- Subclass: Caenogastropoda
- Order: Neogastropoda
- Superfamily: Conoidea
- Family: Drilliidae
- Genus: Splendrillia
- Species: S. kingmai

Binomial name
- Splendrillia kingmai Marwick, 1965

Species of gastropod

Splendrillia kingmai is a species of sea snail, a marine gastropod mollusk in the family Drilliidae.

This species is also described as a fossil.

== Distribution ==
This marine species is endemic to New Zealand and occurs off Ninety Mile Beach, North Island.
