= Splendrillia runcinata =

Scientific classification
- Kingdom: Animalia
- Phylum: Mollusca
- Class: Gastropoda
- Subclass: Caenogastropoda
- Order: Neogastropoda
- Superfamily: Conoidea
- Family: Drilliidae
- Genus: Splendrillia
- Species: S. runcinata

Binomial name
- Splendrillia runcinata Dell, 1956

Species of gastropod

Splendrillia runcinata is a species of sea snail, a marine gastropod mollusk in the family Drilliidae.

== Description ==
The length of the shell attains 9 mm, its diameter is 3.2 mm. It is a non-broadcast spawner without a trocophore stage.

== Distribution ==
This marine species is endemic to New Zealand and occurs off the Chatham Islands at 196-340 m.
