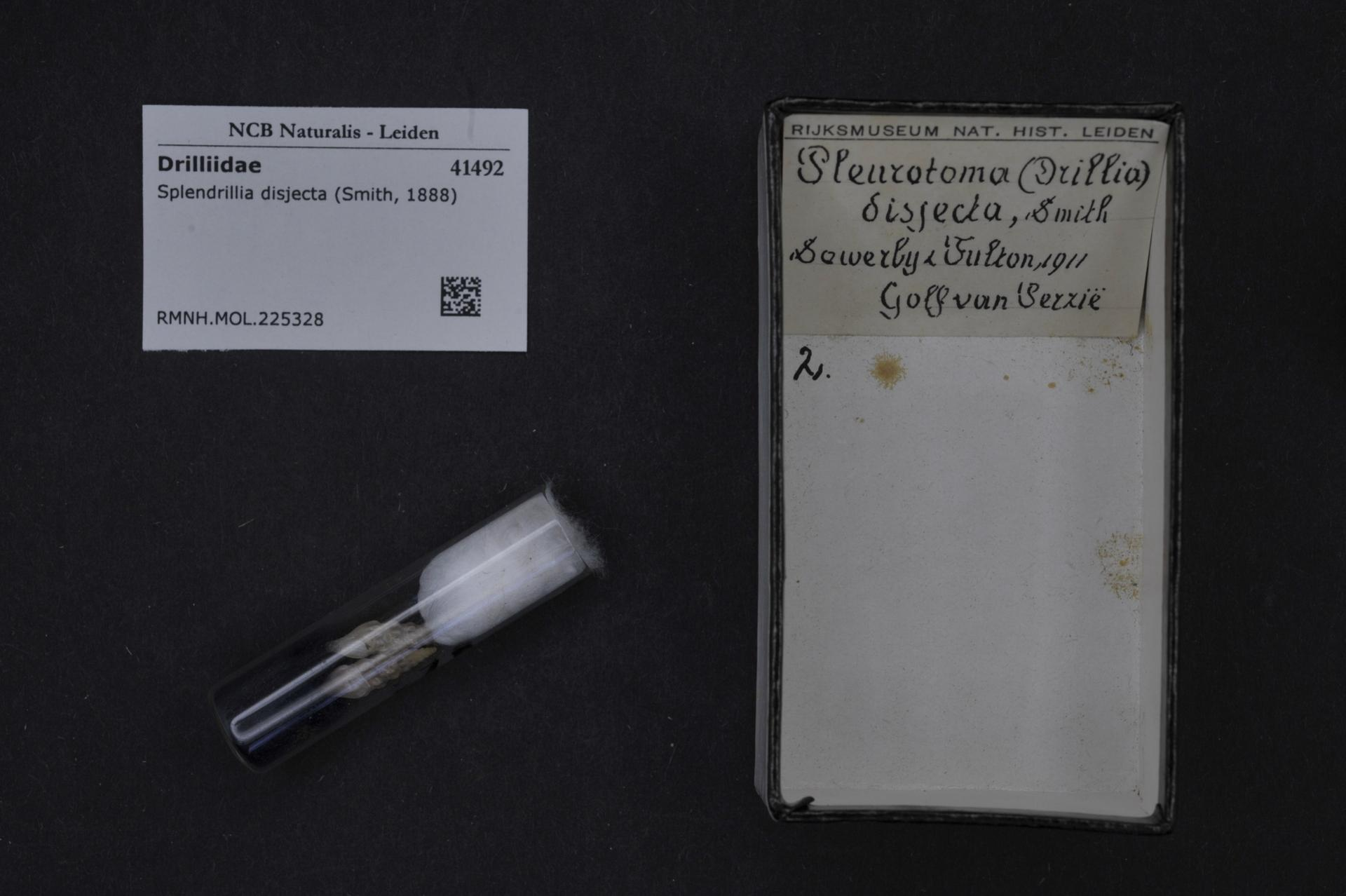

Scientific classification
- Kingdom: Animalia
- Phylum: Mollusca
- Class: Gastropoda
- Subclass: Caenogastropoda
- Order: Neogastropoda
- Superfamily: Conoidea
- Family: Drilliidae
- Genus: Splendrillia
- Species: S. disjecta

Binomial name
- Splendrillia disjecta (E.A. Smith, 1888)

Synonyms
- Drillia disjecta (Smith, E.A., 1888); Pleurotoma (Drillia) disjecta E.A. Smith, 1888 (original combination)

= Splendrillia disjecta =

Species of gastropod

Splendrillia disjecta is a species of sea snail, a marine gastropod mollusk in the family Drilliidae.

== Description ==
The length of the shell attains 7.5 mm, its diameter 2.5 mm.

== Distribution ==
This marine species occurs in the Persian Gulf, the Gulf of Oman and off Fiji
