= Splendrillia arga =

Scientific classification
- Kingdom: Animalia
- Phylum: Mollusca
- Class: Gastropoda
- Subclass: Caenogastropoda
- Order: Neogastropoda
- Superfamily: Conoidea
- Family: Drilliidae
- Genus: Splendrillia
- Species: S. arga

Binomial name
- Splendrillia arga McLean & Poorman, 1971

Species of gastropod

Splendrillia arga is a species of sea snail, a marine gastropod mollusk in the family Drilliidae.

== Description ==
The length of the shell attains 9.3 mm, its diameter 3.2 mm.

== Distribution ==
This species occurs in the demersal zone of the Pacific Ocean between Mexico and Panama.

== Habitat and ecology ==
While specific ecological studies on S. arga are lacking, species in the family Drilliidae are generally carnivorous, feeding on small benthic invertebrates using a toxoglossan radula adapted for predation. Drilliids are typically found in tropical and subtropical marine environments, where they inhabit soft-bottom substrates in the continental shelf and slope zones.

These snails are part of the demersal fauna, living near or on the seafloor. Reproductive and behavioral data for Splendrillia arga specifically have not been documented in the scientific literature. However, related drilliid species exhibit direct development, with eggs laid in capsules and juvenile snails emerging without a free-swimming larval stage, a trait common in many conoidean gastropods.
