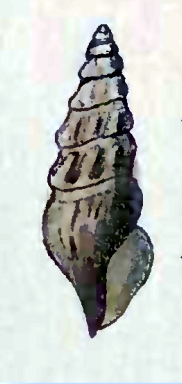
- Drawing of a shell of Splendrillia raricostata

Scientific classification
- Kingdom: Animalia
- Phylum: Mollusca
- Class: Gastropoda
- Subclass: Caenogastropoda
- Order: Neogastropoda
- Superfamily: Conoidea
- Family: Drilliidae
- Genus: Splendrillia
- Species: S. raricostata

Binomial name
- Splendrillia raricostata (E.A. Smith, 1879)

Synonyms
- Drillia paricostata E.A. Smith, 1879; Drillia raricostata E.A. Smith, 1879

= Splendrillia raricostata =

Species of gastropod

Splendrillia raricostata is a species of sea snail, a marine gastropod mollusk in the family Drilliidae.

== Description ==
The length of the shell attains 10 mm, its diameter 3⅓ mm.

(Original description) The elongate, shining shell is horny brown. It contains 8 whorls. Two whorls are apical transversely keeled and angled round the middle. The rest are concavely excavated above, convex below, coarsely obliquely plicated, and somewhat margined beneath the suture. The plicae terminate abruptly at the concavity, eight on a whorl, very oblique, gradually shorter on ascending the spire, so that the upper rather acute ends fall about the middle of the whorls. The ribs on the body whorl are obsolete at the base, which is obliquely grooved. The aperture is very small, about one third as long as the whole shell. The sinus is deep, the inferior sinuation is shallow. The outer lip is thin, curved and prominent, with a swollen varix some distance behind the margin. The columella is scarcely oblique, but slightly sinuous covered with a callosity, tuberculated above at the suture. The siphonal canal is very short and a little recurved.

The color of the shell is horny brown. The whorls are excavated above and somewhat margined at the suture. They show a few strong, oblique ribs, terminating above at the periphery. The body whorl is obliquely grooved at the base.

== Distribution ==
This marine species occurs off Japan.
