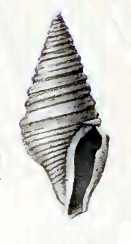
- Original image of a shell of Splendrillia clydonia

Scientific classification
- Kingdom: Animalia
- Phylum: Mollusca
- Class: Gastropoda
- Subclass: Caenogastropoda
- Order: Neogastropoda
- Superfamily: Conoidea
- Family: Drilliidae
- Genus: Splendrillia
- Species: S. clydonia

Binomial name
- Splendrillia clydonia (Melvill & Standen, 1901)

Synonyms
- Drillia clydonia Melvill & Standen, 1901; Pleurotoma (Crassispira) clydonia (Melvill & Standen, 1901)

= Splendrillia clydonia =

Species of gastropod

Splendrillia clydonia is a species of sea snail, a marine gastropod mollusk in the family Drilliidae.

== Description ==
The length of the shell attains 15 mm, its diameter 5 mm.

(Original description) The shell is shining, nearly smooth, pale, whitish, straw-coloured, or reddish-tinted. It is, attenuate, graceful and contains 9 whorls. The longitudinal ribs are somewhat prominently twice-angled just below the middle, and obliquely flexuose, shining, and almost smooth. On the penultimate whorl the ribs number 11, on the body whorl 10. The spiral revolving lines are discernible with a lens. The aperture is oblong. The sinus is very wide and somewhat shallow. The outer lip is thin and rounded. The columella is white, straight, callous above and shining. The siphonal canal is a little produced and is broad.

== Distribution ==
This species occurs in the Gulf of Oman.
