= Splendrillia aomoriensis =

Scientific classification
- Kingdom: Animalia
- Phylum: Mollusca
- Class: Gastropoda
- Subclass: Caenogastropoda
- Order: Neogastropoda
- Superfamily: Conoidea
- Family: Drilliidae
- Genus: Splendrillia
- Species: S. aomoriensis

Binomial name
- Splendrillia aomoriensis (Nomura & Hatai, 1940)

Synonyms
- Clavus aomoriensis (Nomura & Hatai, 1940); Elaeocyma (Splendrillia) aomoriensis (Nomura & Hatai, 1940); Leptadrillia aomoriensis Nomura & Hatai, 1940 (basionym)

Species of gastropod

Splendrillia aomoriensis is a species of sea snail, a marine gastropod mollusk in the family Drilliidae.

== Description ==
The length of the shell attains 8 mm.

== Distribution ==
This species occurs in the demersal zone of the Pacific Ocean off Japan and the PhilippinesThis marine species occurs in the Northwest Pacific Ocean, off the coast of Japan (type locality: Kyûroku-shima and vicinity, northeast Honshu).
