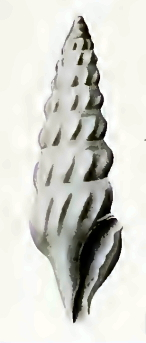
- Original image of a shell of Splendrillia lygdina

Scientific classification
- Kingdom: Animalia
- Phylum: Mollusca
- Class: Gastropoda
- Subclass: Caenogastropoda
- Order: Neogastropoda
- Superfamily: Conoidea
- Family: Drilliidae
- Genus: Splendrillia
- Species: S. lygdina

Binomial name
- Splendrillia lygdina (Hedley, 1922)

Synonyms
- Melatoma lygdina Hedley, 1922

= Splendrillia lygdina =

Species of gastropod

Splendrillia lygdina is a species of sea snail, a marine gastropod mollusk in the family Drilliidae.

== Description ==
The length of the shell attains 27 mm, its diameter 8.5 mm.

(Original description) The thin, lanceolate, uniform yellowish-gray shell is subturreted. Its spire is produced, the base constricted. The shell contains more than ten whorls (the holotype has an imperfect apex). The fasciole is only indicated by the even truncation of the ribs. The surface is smooth, so that a few microscopic growth scratches are only just perceptible. The ribs are prominent, short, oblique, wave-shaped, spaced about twelve to a whorl. Just behind the aperture the ribbing becomes irregular, the place of a final rib being taken by three small riblets -which coalesce above. The aperture is pyriform. The sinus is U-shaped and rather deep.

== Distribution ==
This marine species is endemic to Australia and occurs off Victoria.
