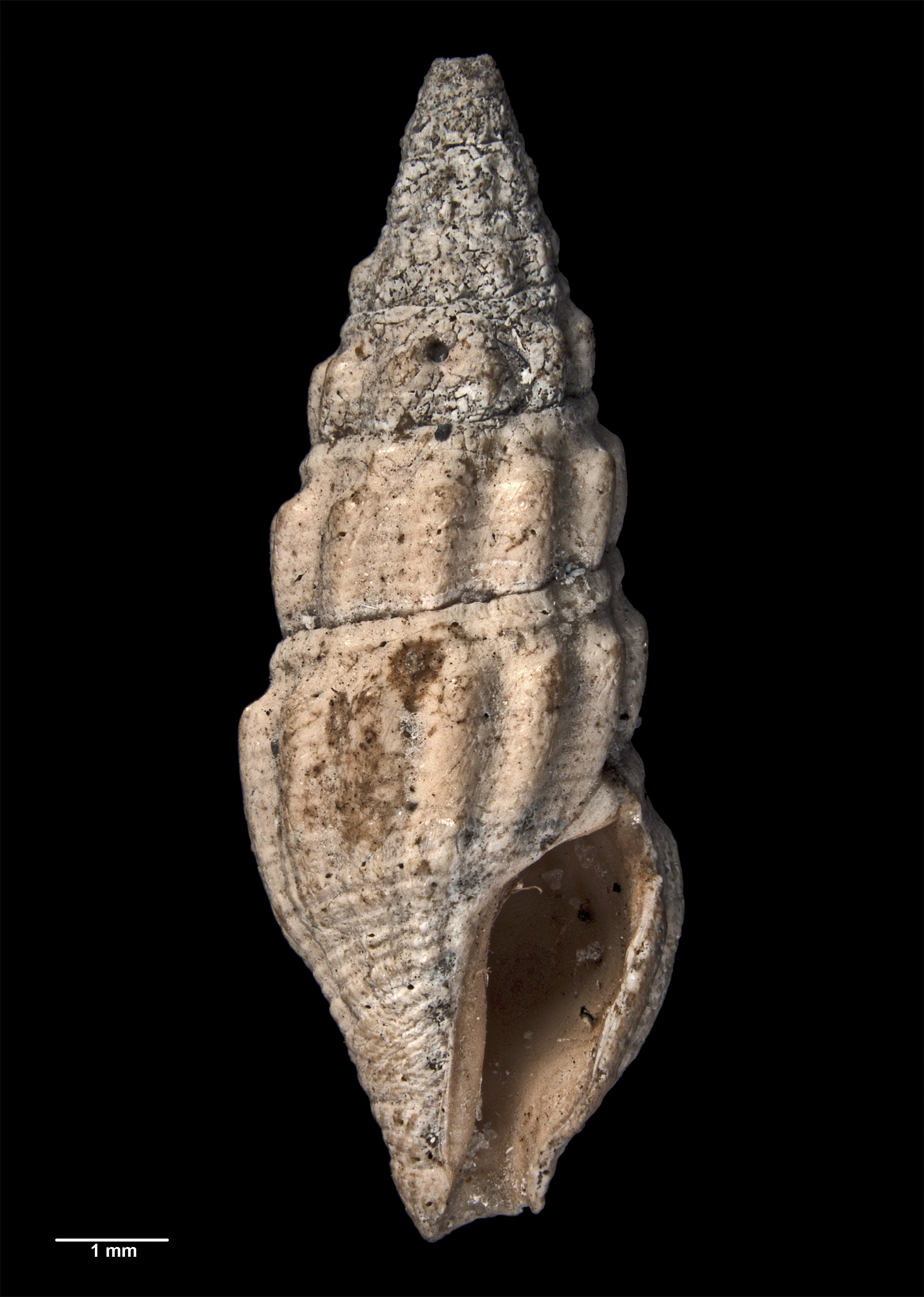
- Holotype from Auckland War Memorial Museum

Scientific classification
- Kingdom: Animalia
- Phylum: Mollusca
- Class: Gastropoda
- Subclass: Caenogastropoda
- Order: Neogastropoda
- Family: Drilliidae
- Genus: Splendrillia
- Species: †S. adelaidae

Binomial name
- †Splendrillia adelaidae A. W. B. Powell, 1944

= Splendrillia adelaidae =

Splendrillia adelaidae Temporal range: middle Miocene

Extinct species of gastropod

Splendrillia adelaidae is an extinct species of sea snail, a marine gastropod mollusc in the family Drilliidae. Fossils of the species date to the middle Miocene, and occur in the strata of the St Vincent Basin of South Australia.

== Description ==
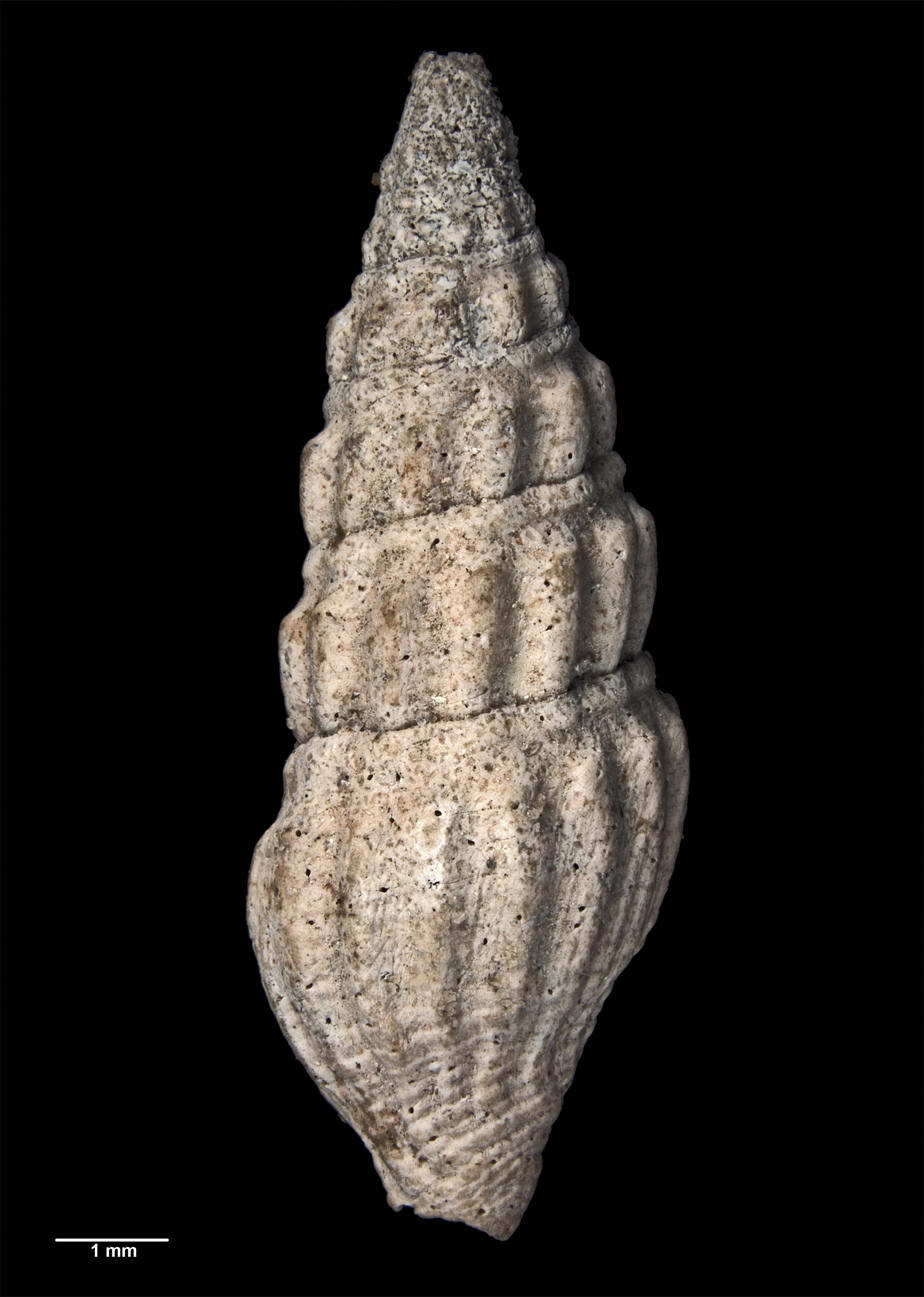
Reverse view of holotype

In the original description, Powell described the species as follows:

Shell moderately large, proportionately broad, strongly axially and spirally sculptured as in the Recent harpularia. Axials vertical, broadly rounded, 12 per whorl, tops sharply planed off at peripheral angle, but extended weakly over base. Surface covered with deeply incised spirals, six on spire-whorls and about 26 on body-whorl, base and neck. Subsutural fold strong, flattened. Shoulder deeply concave. Parietal callus pad heavy; sinus broadly rounded, moderately deep.

The holotype of the species measures 11.3 mm (0.44 in) in height and 4.15 mm (0.163 in) in diameter.

== Taxonomy ==
The species was first described by A.W.B. Powell in 1944. The holotype was collected by W. Howchin and J.C. Verco in 1919, from the Metropolitan Abattoirs Bore in Adelaide, at a depth of between 122–152 m (400–499 ft). The holotype is held by the Auckland War Memorial Museum.

== Distribution ==
This extinct marine species dates to the middle Miocene, and occurs in the strata of the St Vincent Basin of South Australia, known from the Dry Creek Sands.
