= Splendrillia grandis =

Scientific classification
- Kingdom: Animalia
- Phylum: Mollusca
- Class: Gastropoda
- Subclass: Caenogastropoda
- Order: Neogastropoda
- Superfamily: Conoidea
- Family: Drilliidae
- Genus: Splendrillia
- Species: S. grandis

Binomial name
- Splendrillia grandis Fallon, 2016

Species of gastropod

Splendrillia grandis is a species of sea snail, a marine gastropod mollusk in the family Drilliidae.

== Description ==
The length of the shell attains 18 mm.

== Distribution ==
This marine species occurs in the Caribbean Sea off the Campeche Bank, Yucatán, Mexico.
