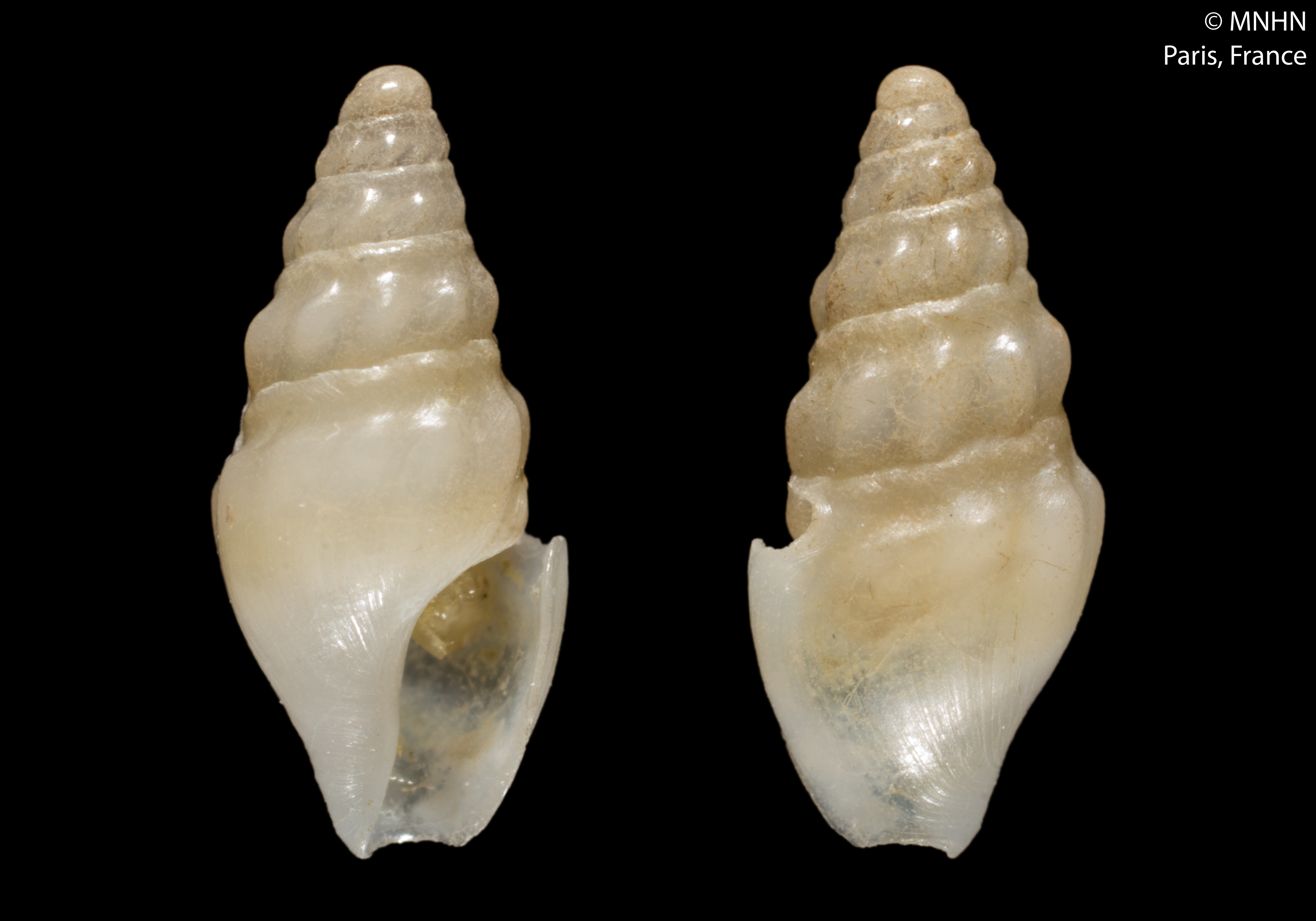
- Shell of Splendrillia carolae (holotype at MNHN, Paris)

Scientific classification
- Kingdom: Animalia
- Phylum: Mollusca
- Class: Gastropoda
- Subclass: Caenogastropoda
- Order: Neogastropoda
- Superfamily: Conoidea
- Family: Drilliidae
- Genus: Splendrillia
- Species: S. carolae

Binomial name
- Splendrillia carolae Wells, 1995

= Splendrillia carolae =

Species of gastropod

Splendrillia carolae is a species of sea snail, a marine gastropod mollusk in the family Drilliidae.

== Description ==
The length of the shell attains 5.6 mm. the base of the shell is an off-white that gradually gets tannish brown as the shell goes up. Splendrillia Carolae's shell is in a spiral shape.

== Distribution ==
This marine species occurs off the southern tip of New Caledonia.
