= Splendrillia eva =

Scientific classification
- Kingdom: Animalia
- Phylum: Mollusca
- Class: Gastropoda
- Subclass: Caenogastropoda
- Order: Neogastropoda
- Superfamily: Conoidea
- Family: Drilliidae
- Genus: Splendrillia
- Species: S. eva

Binomial name
- Splendrillia eva (Thiele, 1925)

Synonyms
- Drillia eva Thiele, 1925; Drillia (Cymatosyrinx) eva Thiele, 1925; Tomopleura (Maoritomella) eva (Thiele, 1925)

Species of gastropod

Splendrillia eva is a species of sea snail, a marine gastropod mollusk in the family Drilliidae.

== Description ==
The length of the shell attains 8.4 mm, its diameter 3.5 mm.

== Distribution ==
This marine species occurs off the upper continental slope of Transkei, South Africa.
