= Splendrillia hermata =

Scientific classification
- Kingdom: Animalia
- Phylum: Mollusca
- Class: Gastropoda
- Subclass: Caenogastropoda
- Order: Neogastropoda
- Superfamily: Conoidea
- Family: Drilliidae
- Genus: Splendrillia
- Species: S. hermata

Binomial name
- Splendrillia hermata Dell, 1956

Species of gastropod

Splendrillia hermata is a species of sea snail, a marine gastropod mollusk in the family Drilliidae.

== Description ==
The shell of this species is relatively small, with a length reaching up to 18 mm and a diameter of about 6 mm. It features a turriculated and fusiform shape characteristic of the family Drilliidae. The holotype specimen was originally collected during an expedition by the MV Alert on January 23, 1954, and is currently housed at the Museum of New Zealand Te Papa Tongarewa under the registration number M.009787.

== Distribution ==
The type locality of this marine gastropod is located in the New Zealand Exclusive Economic Zone, specifically around the Mernoo Bank area of the Chatham Rise, where it inhabits benthic environments at depths ranging between 180 to 242 metres.
