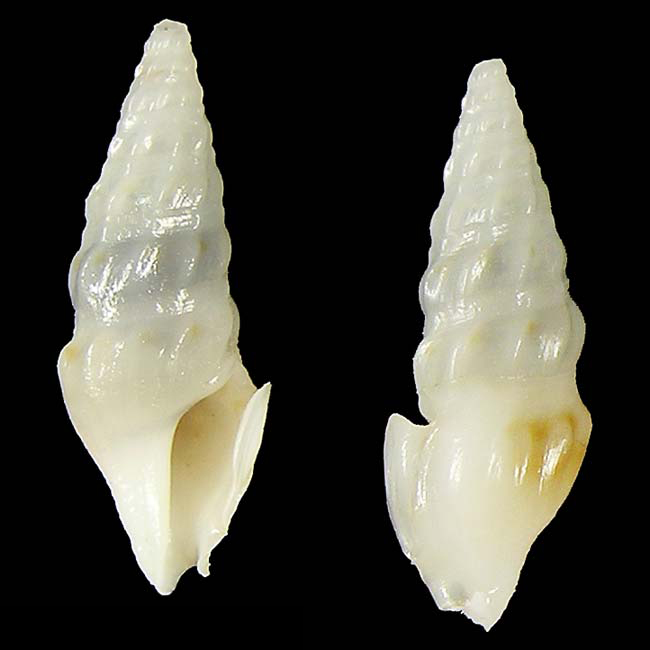

Scientific classification
- Kingdom: Animalia
- Phylum: Mollusca
- Class: Gastropoda
- Subclass: Caenogastropoda
- Order: Neogastropoda
- Superfamily: Conoidea
- Family: Drilliidae
- Genus: Splendrillia
- Species: S. bozzettii

Binomial name
- Splendrillia bozzettii Stahlschmidt, Poppe & Tagaro, 2018

= Splendrillia bozzettii =

Species of gastropod

Splendrillia bozzettii is a species of sea snail, a marine gastropod mollusc in the family Drilliidae.

== Taxonomy ==
The species was described in 2018 by Peter Stahlschmidt, Guido T. Poppe and Sheila P. Tagaro in the malacological journal Visaya, in a paper describing several new turrid species from the Philippines.

== Distribution ==
This marine species occurs off the Philippines.

== Description ==
The size of the shell reaches approximately 17.9 mm.
