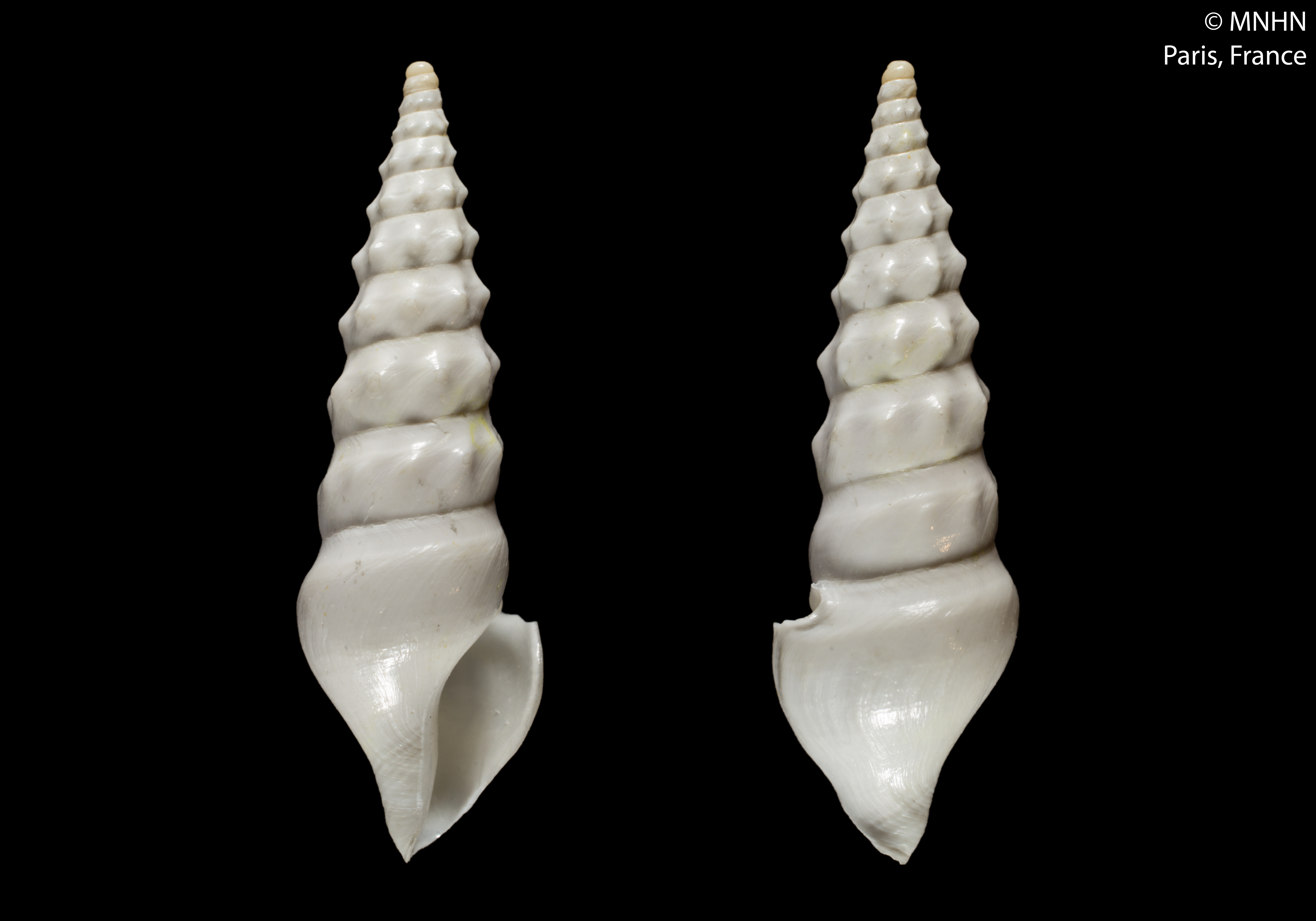
- Shell of Splendrillia elongata F. E. Wells, 1995 (homonym)

Scientific classification
- Kingdom: Animalia
- Phylum: Mollusca
- Class: Gastropoda
- Subclass: Caenogastropoda
- Order: Neogastropoda
- Superfamily: Conoidea
- Family: Drilliidae
- Genus: Splendrillia
- Species: S. elongata

Binomial name
- Splendrillia elongata Wells, 1995

= Splendrillia elongata =

Species of gastropod

Splendrillia elongata is a species of sea snail, a marine gastropod mollusk in the family Drilliidae.

== Homonymy ==
The extinct species Splendrillia elongata Beu, 1980, and the extant species Splendrillia elongata Wells, 1995, are homonyms, but not synonyms. A replacement name will have to be established for the junior name.

== Distribution ==
This marine species occurs off New Caledonia.
