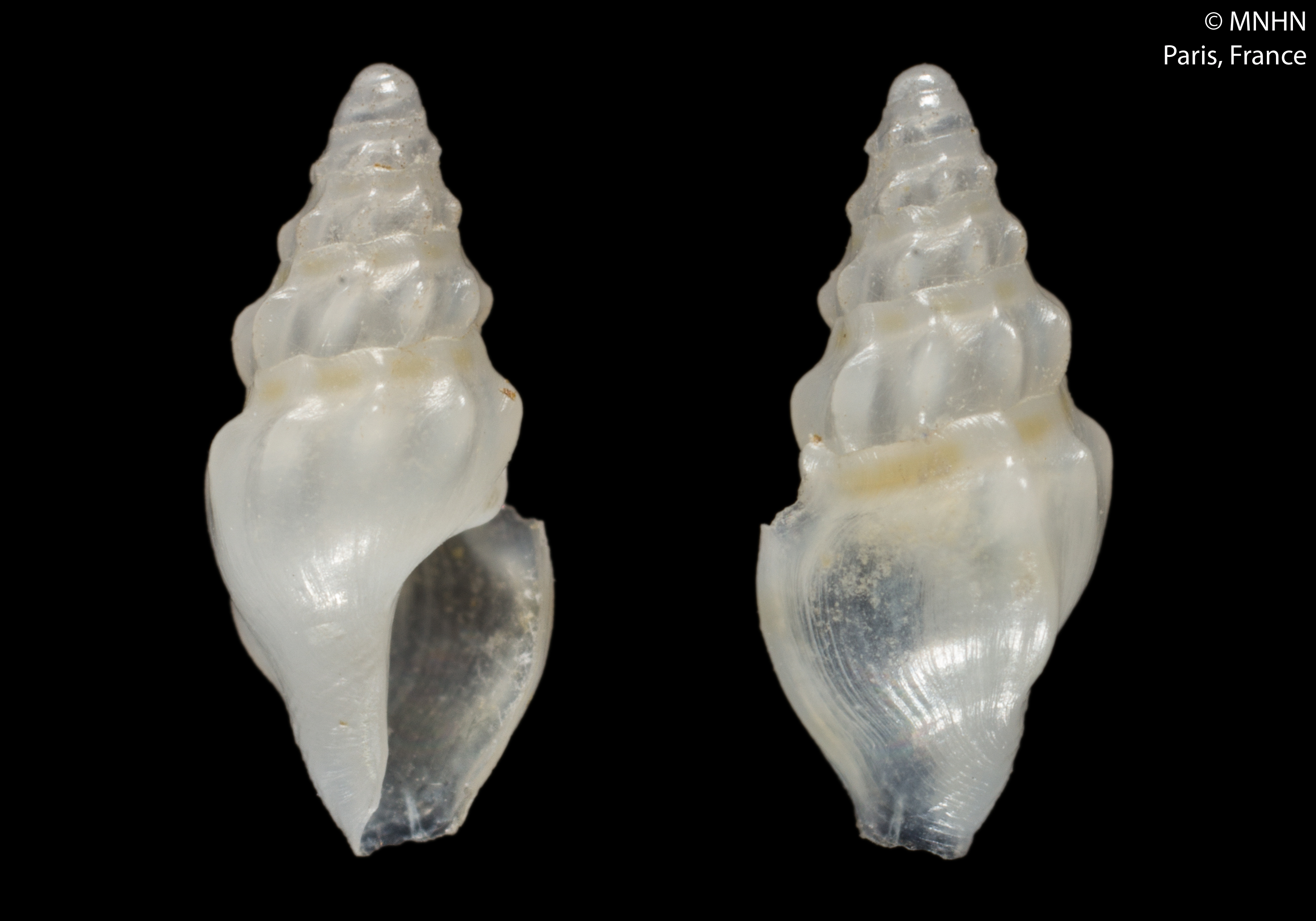
- Shell of Splendrillia wayae (holotype at MNHN, Paris)

Scientific classification
- Kingdom: Animalia
- Phylum: Mollusca
- Class: Gastropoda
- Subclass: Caenogastropoda
- Order: Neogastropoda
- Superfamily: Conoidea
- Family: Drilliidae
- Genus: Splendrillia
- Species: S. wayae

Binomial name
- Splendrillia wayae Wells, 1995

= Splendrillia wayae =

Species of gastropod

Splendrillia wayae is a species of sea snail, a marine gastropod mollusk in the family Drilliidae.

== Description ==
The length of the shell is 5.2 mm.

== Distribution ==
This marine species occurs off New Caledonia.
