= Splendrillia hedleyi =

Scientific classification
- Kingdom: Animalia
- Phylum: Mollusca
- Class: Gastropoda
- Subclass: Caenogastropoda
- Order: Neogastropoda
- Superfamily: Conoidea
- Family: Drilliidae
- Genus: Splendrillia
- Species: S. hedleyi

Binomial name
- Splendrillia hedleyi Wells, 1990

Species of gastropod

Splendrillia hedleyi is a species of sea snail, a marine gastropod mollusk in the family Drilliidae.

== Distribution ==
This marine species is endemic to Australia and occurs off Queensland.
