= Splendrillia vinki =

Scientific classification
- Kingdom: Animalia
- Phylum: Mollusca
- Class: Gastropoda
- Subclass: Caenogastropoda
- Order: Neogastropoda
- Superfamily: Conoidea
- Family: Drilliidae
- Genus: Splendrillia
- Species: S. vinki

Binomial name
- Splendrillia vinki (De Jong & Coomans, 1988)

Synonyms
- Inodrillia vinki De Jong & Coomans, 1988 (original combination)

Species of gastropod

Splendrillia vinki is a species of sea snail, a marine gastropod mollusk in the family Drilliidae.

== Description ==
The length of the shell varies between 8 mm and 12.2 mm.

== Distribution ==
This marine species occurs in the Caribbean Sea off Aruba.
