= Splendrillia chathamensis =

Scientific classification
- Kingdom: Animalia
- Phylum: Mollusca
- Class: Gastropoda
- Subclass: Caenogastropoda
- Order: Neogastropoda
- Superfamily: Conoidea
- Family: Drilliidae
- Genus: Splendrillia
- Species: S. chathamensis

Binomial name
- Splendrillia chathamensis Sysoev & Kantor, 1989

Species of gastropod

Splendrillia chathamensis is a species of sea snail, a marine gastropod mollusk in the family Drilliidae.

== Description ==
The length of the shell attains 10.5 mm, its diameter 4.3 mm.

== Distribution ==
S. chathamensis can be found in the waters surrounding the Western Chatham Rise, New Zealand. at a depth of 850 m.
