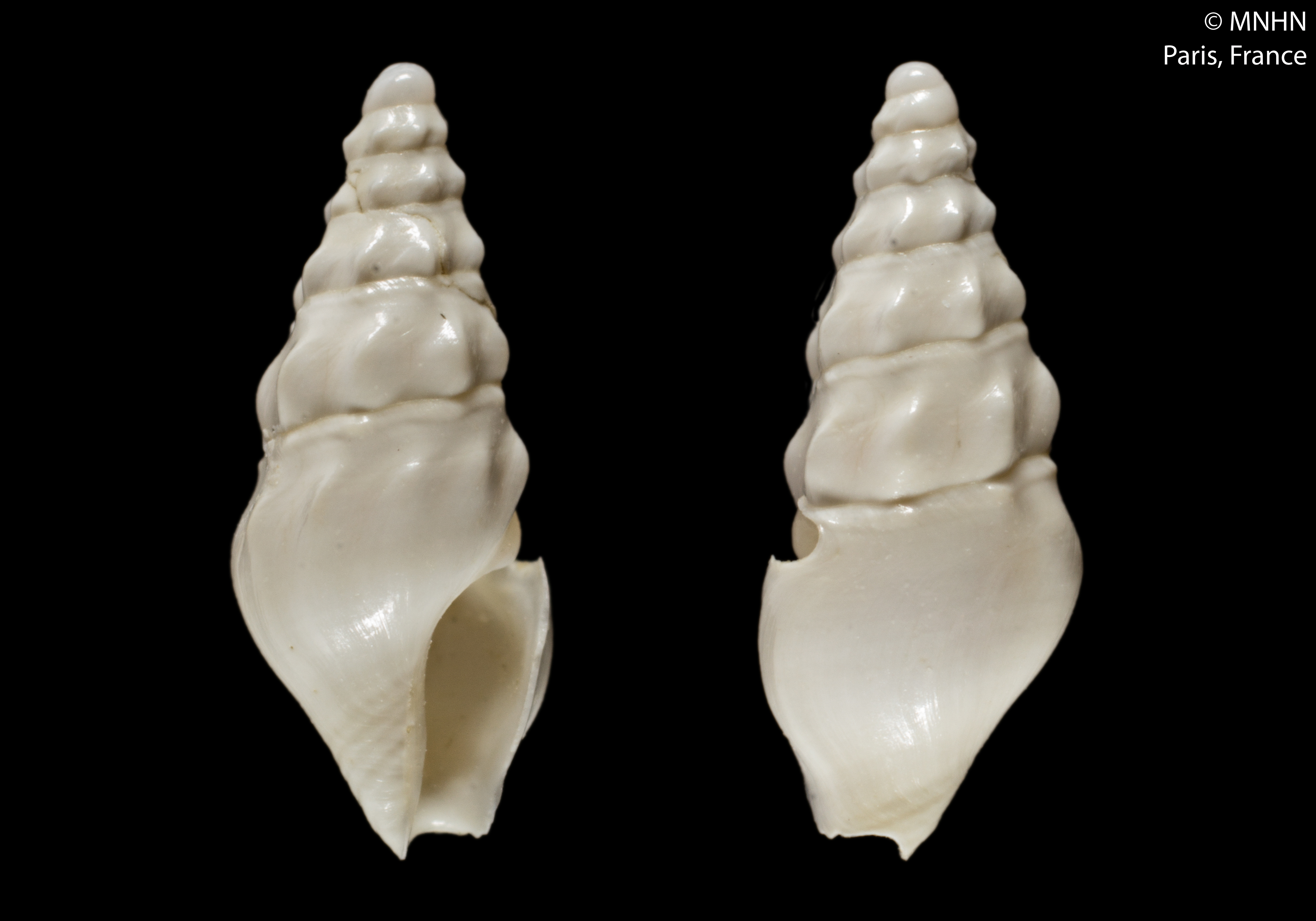
- Shell of Splendrillia minima (holotype at MNHN, Paris)

Scientific classification
- Kingdom: Animalia
- Phylum: Mollusca
- Class: Gastropoda
- Subclass: Caenogastropoda
- Order: Neogastropoda
- Superfamily: Conoidea
- Family: Drilliidae
- Genus: Splendrillia
- Species: S. minima

Binomial name
- Splendrillia minima Wells, 1995

= Splendrillia minima =

Species of gastropod

Splendrillia minima is a species of sea snail, a marine gastropod mollusk in the family Drilliidae.

== Description ==
The length of the shell attains approximately 6 mm, making it a relatively small shell. The shell is characterized by its compact size and overall morphology, which can be useful in distinguishing the species from other closely related taxa.

== Distribution ==
This marine species occurs off New Caledonia and the Philippines.
