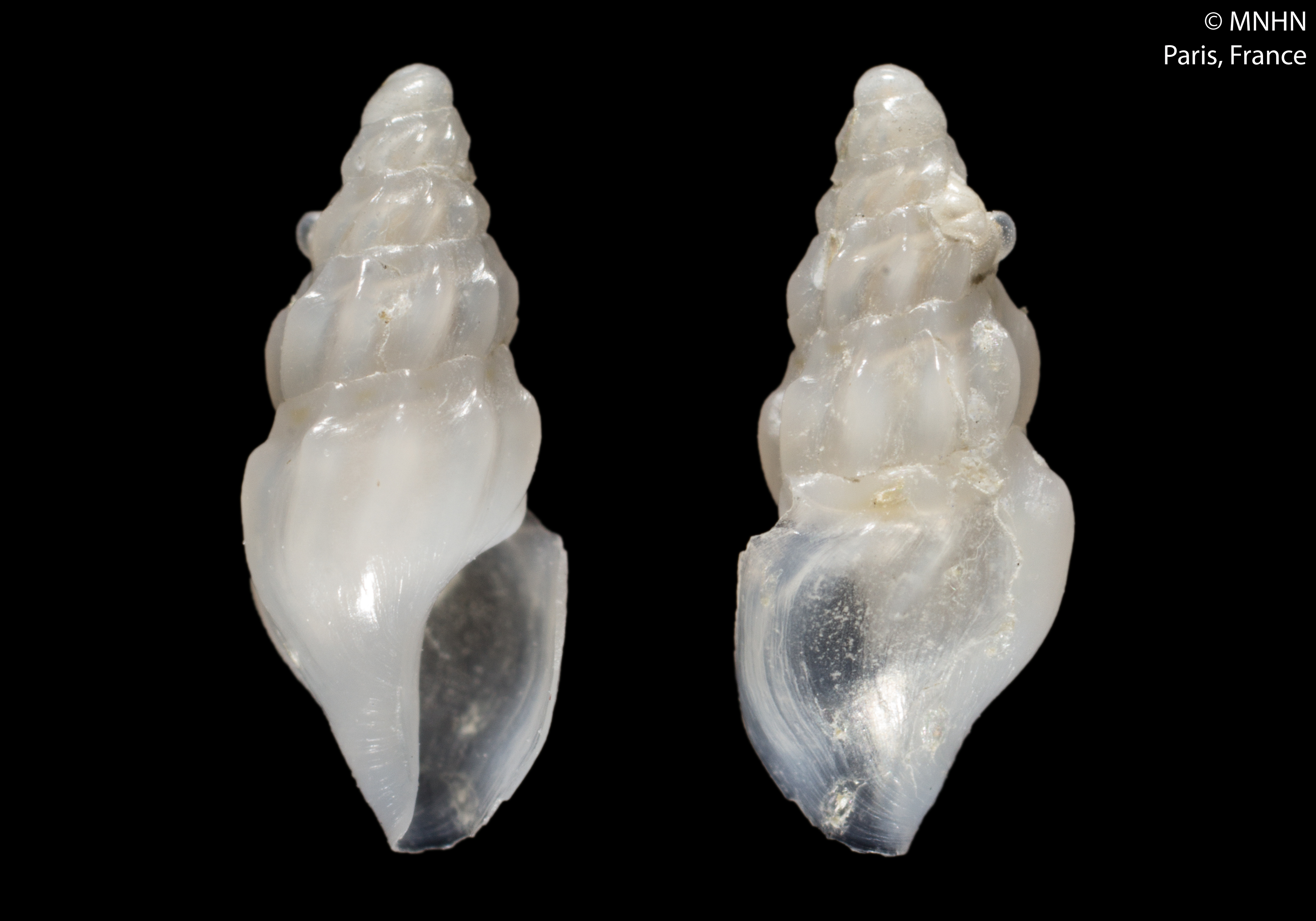
- Shell of Splendrillia houbricki (holotype at MNHN, Paris)

Scientific classification
- Kingdom: Animalia
- Phylum: Mollusca
- Class: Gastropoda
- Subclass: Caenogastropoda
- Order: Neogastropoda
- Superfamily: Conoidea
- Family: Drilliidae
- Genus: Splendrillia
- Species: S. houbricki

Binomial name
- Splendrillia houbricki Wells, 1995

= Splendrillia houbricki =

Species of gastropod

Splendrillia houbricki is a species of sea snail, a marine gastropod mollusk in the family Drilliidae.

== Description ==
The length of the shell attains 5.4 mm.

== Distribution ==
This marine species occurs in the Mozambique Channel.
