= Splendrillia zeobliqua =

Scientific classification
- Kingdom: Animalia
- Phylum: Mollusca
- Class: Gastropoda
- Subclass: Caenogastropoda
- Order: Neogastropoda
- Superfamily: Conoidea
- Family: Drilliidae
- Genus: Splendrillia
- Species: S. zeobliqua

Binomial name
- Splendrillia zeobliqua Beu, 1979

Species of gastropod

Splendrillia zeobliqua is a species of sea snail, a marine gastropod mollusk in the family Drilliidae.

This extant species is also described as a fossil from the Late Pliocene off Kaikōura Peninsula, New Zealand.

== Description ==
The shell attains a length of 18 millimetres (0.71 in) and a diameter 8.5 millimetres (0.33 in).

== Distribution ==
This marine species is endemic to New Zealand and occurs off South Island. Pegasus Canyon, North Canterbury.
