= Splendrillia whangaimoana =

Scientific classification
- Kingdom: Animalia
- Phylum: Mollusca
- Class: Gastropoda
- Subclass: Caenogastropoda
- Order: Neogastropoda
- Superfamily: Conoidea
- Family: Drilliidae
- Genus: Splendrillia
- Species: S. whangaimoana

Binomial name
- Splendrillia whangaimoana Vella, 1954

Extinct species of gastropod

Splendrillia whangaimoana is an extinct species of sea snail, a marine gastropod mollusk in the family Drilliidae.

== Description ==
The length of the shell attains 14.3 mm, its diameter 6.1 mm.

== Distribution ==
This extinct marine species was endemic to New Zealand.
