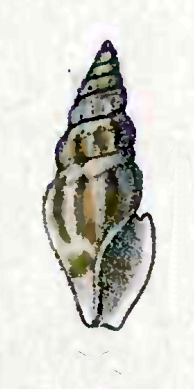
- Drawing of a shell of Splendrillia intermaculata

Scientific classification
- Kingdom: Animalia
- Phylum: Mollusca
- Class: Gastropoda
- Subclass: Caenogastropoda
- Order: Neogastropoda
- Superfamily: Conoidea
- Family: Drilliidae
- Genus: Splendrillia
- Species: S. intermaculata

Binomial name
- Splendrillia intermaculata (E.A. Smith, 1879)

Synonyms
- Drillia intermaculata E.A. Smith, 1879

= Splendrillia intermaculata =

Species of gastropod

Splendrillia intermaculata is a species of sea snail, a marine gastropod mollusk in the family Drilliidae.

== Description ==
The shining, subpellucid, white shell shows four revolving series of brownish yellow dots between the ribs on the body whorl, and two on those of the spire. The ribs are slight and show no revolving striae.

== Distribution ==
This marine species occurs off South Korea and Japan.
