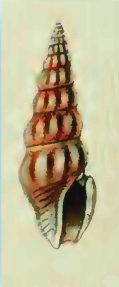
- Image of a shell of Splendrillia resplendens

Scientific classification
- Kingdom: Animalia
- Phylum: Mollusca
- Class: Gastropoda
- Subclass: Caenogastropoda
- Order: Neogastropoda
- Superfamily: Conoidea
- Family: Drilliidae
- Genus: Splendrillia
- Species: S. resplendens

Binomial name
- Splendrillia resplendens (Melvill, 1898)

Synonyms
- Drillia resplendens (Melvill, J.C., 1898); Pleurotoma (Drillia) resplendens Melvill, 1898; Turris (Inquisitor) resplendens (Melvill, J.C., 1898)

= Splendrillia resplendens =

Species of gastropod

Splendrillia resplendens is a species of sea snail, a marine gastropod mollusk in the family Drilliidae.

== Distribution ==
This marine species occurs in the Persian Gulf and the Gulf of Oman.
