= Splendrillia aequistriata =

Scientific classification
- Kingdom: Animalia
- Phylum: Mollusca
- Class: Gastropoda
- Subclass: Caenogastropoda
- Order: Neogastropoda
- Superfamily: Conoidea
- Family: Drilliidae
- Genus: Splendrillia
- Species: S. aequistriata

Binomial name
- Splendrillia aequistriata (Hutton, 1885)

Synonyms
- † Drillia aequistriata Hutton, 1885

Extinct species of gastropod

Splendrillia aequistriata is an extinct species of sea snail, a marine gastropod mollusk in the family Drilliidae.

== Distribution ==
This extinct marine species was endemic to New Zealand.
