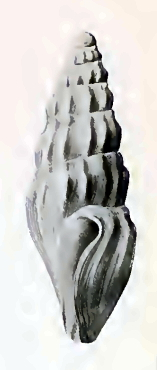
- Original image of a shell of Splendrillia eburnea

Scientific classification
- Kingdom: Animalia
- Phylum: Mollusca
- Class: Gastropoda
- Subclass: Caenogastropoda
- Order: Neogastropoda
- Superfamily: Conoidea
- Family: Drilliidae
- Genus: Splendrillia
- Species: S. eburnea

Binomial name
- Splendrillia eburnea (Hedley, 1922)

Synonyms
- Melatoma eburnea Hedley, 1922

= Splendrillia eburnea =

Species of gastropod

Splendrillia eburnea is a species of sea snail, a marine gastropod mollusk in the family Drilliidae.

== Description ==
The length of the shell attains 10 mm, its diameter 4 mm.

(Original description) The solid, glossy, ivory-yellow shell has a cylindro-fusiform shape. The shell contains 7 whorls, including a two-whorled dome-shaped protoconch. The suture is impressed. There are no spirals. The ribs are set about fourteen to a whorl. They start up suddenly, immediately below the contracted fasciole area. They are prominent, perpendicular, wide-spaced, discontinuous, decreasing anteriorly, become obsolete on the body whorl, and vanish below the periphery. The aperture is wide. There is no varix. The outer lip is simple. The sinus is deep, U-shaped, right insertion incrassate. The throat is smooth. The inner lip is overlaid with a thick polished callus. The siphonal canal is short and open.

== Distribution ==
This marine species is endemic to Australia and occurs off New South Wales and Victoria.
