= Splendrillia roseacincta =

Scientific classification
- Kingdom: Animalia
- Phylum: Mollusca
- Class: Gastropoda
- Subclass: Caenogastropoda
- Order: Neogastropoda
- Superfamily: Conoidea
- Family: Drilliidae
- Genus: Splendrillia
- Species: S. roseacincta

Binomial name
- Splendrillia roseacincta Dell, 1956

Species of gastropod

Splendrillia roseacincta is a species of sea snail, a marine gastropod mollusk in the family Drilliidae.

== Description ==
The length of the shell attains 17 mm, the diameter is 6 mm.

== Distribution ==
This marine species is endemic to New Zealand and occurs off the Chatham Islands.
