= Splendrillia clifdenensis =

Scientific classification
- Kingdom: Animalia
- Phylum: Mollusca
- Class: Gastropoda
- Subclass: Caenogastropoda
- Order: Neogastropoda
- Superfamily: Conoidea
- Family: Drilliidae
- Genus: Splendrillia
- Species: S. clifdenensis

Binomial name
- Splendrillia clifdenensis Powell, 1942

Extinct species of gastropod

Splendrillia clifdenensis is an extinct species of sea snail, a marine gastropod mollusk in the family Drilliidae.

== Distribution ==
This extinct marine species was endemic to New Zealand.
