= Splendrillia stellae =

Scientific classification
- Kingdom: Animalia
- Phylum: Mollusca
- Class: Gastropoda
- Subclass: Caenogastropoda
- Order: Neogastropoda
- Superfamily: Conoidea
- Family: Drilliidae
- Genus: Splendrillia
- Species: S. stellae

Binomial name
- Splendrillia stellae Fallon, 2016

Species of gastropod

Splendrillia stellae is a species of sea snail, a marine gastropod mollusk in the family Drilliidae.

== Description ==
The shell of Splendrillia stellae is elongated and narrow, typical of the Drilliidae family. While the coloration and precise morphological characteristics may vary, it often has a glossy surface with spiral ridges or fine lines running along its length. The shell size generally ranges around approximately 7.5 millimeters in length. This species, like others in the Splendrillia genus, possesses a siphonal canal and a sharp apex, both of which aid in identifying it from similar gastropods.

== Distribution ==
This marine species occurs in the Caribbean Sea off Aruba.
