= Splendrillia campbellensis =

Scientific classification
- Kingdom: Animalia
- Phylum: Mollusca
- Class: Gastropoda
- Subclass: Caenogastropoda
- Order: Neogastropoda
- Superfamily: Conoidea
- Family: Drilliidae
- Genus: Splendrillia
- Species: S. campbellensis

Binomial name
- Splendrillia campbellensis Sysoev & Kantor, 1989

Species of gastropod

Splendrillia campbellensis is a species of sea snail, a marine gastropod mollusk in the family Drilliidae.

The species was named after the Campell Plateau were the holotype was found.

== Description ==
The length of the shell attains 14.6 mm, its diameter 5 mm.

== Distribution ==
S. campbellensis can be found in the waters surrounding the Antipodes Islands, New Zealand. at a depth of about 1,000 m.
