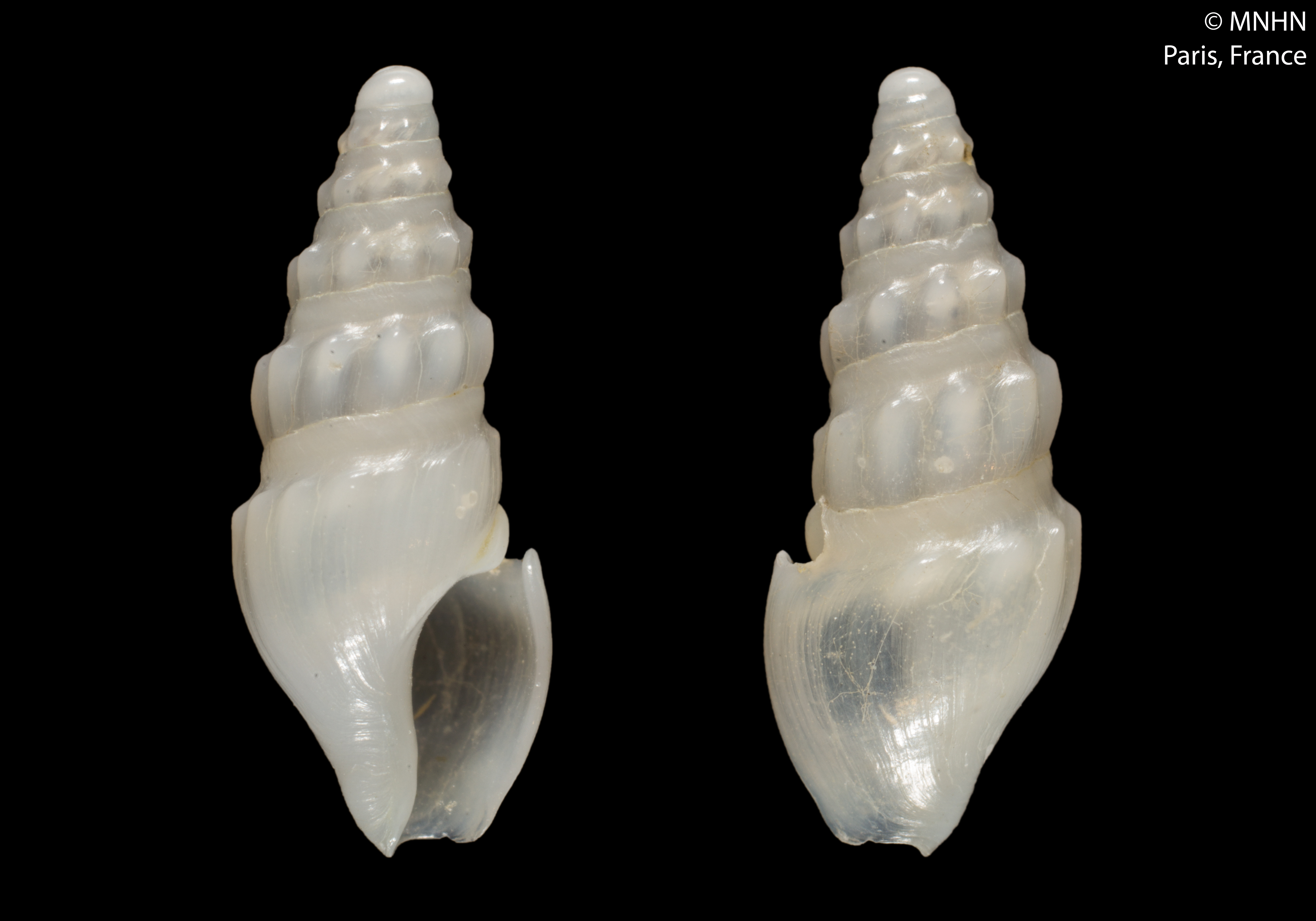
- Shell of Splendrillia brycei (holotype at MNHN, Paris)

Scientific classification
- Kingdom: Animalia
- Phylum: Mollusca
- Class: Gastropoda
- Subclass: Caenogastropoda
- Order: Neogastropoda
- Superfamily: Conoidea
- Family: Drilliidae
- Genus: Splendrillia
- Species: S. brycei

Binomial name
- Splendrillia brycei Wells, 1995

= Splendrillia brycei =

Species of gastropod

Splendrillia brycei is a species of sea snail, a marine gastropod mollusk in the family Drilliidae.

== Description ==
The length of the shell attains 9.5 mm.

== Distribution ==
This marine species occurs off New Caledonia.
