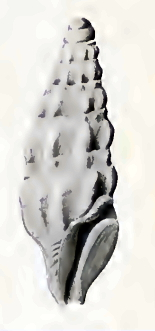
- Original image of a shell of Splendrillia candidula

Scientific classification
- Kingdom: Animalia
- Phylum: Mollusca
- Class: Gastropoda
- Subclass: Caenogastropoda
- Order: Neogastropoda
- Superfamily: Conoidea
- Family: Drilliidae
- Genus: Splendrillia
- Species: S. candidula

Binomial name
- Splendrillia candidula (Hedley, 1922)

Synonyms
- Clathurella quisqualis Brazier, 1876; Clavus candidulus Hedley, 1922; Splendrillia quisqualis (J.W. Brazier, 1876)

= Splendrillia candidula =

Species of gastropod

Splendrillia candidula is a species of sea snail, a marine gastropod mollusk in the family Drilliidae.

== Description ==
The length of the shell attains 11 mm, its diameter 2.5 mm.

(Original description) The small, solid, ice-white shell has a subcylindrical shape and is very glossy. The shell contains 7 whorls, inclusive of the protoconch—a small smooth dome of two whorls. The only spirals on the shell are four lines on the snout. The ribs are broad and low, crowded above, and becoming more spaced as growth proceeds. They become evanescent on the last half whorl, discontinuous from whorl to whorl, amounting to eight on the penultimate, sometimes lightly impressed and sometimes interrupted by the fasciole, which is not otherwise apparent. The suture is sinuate. The aperture is fusiform. The outer lip is expanded and bent inwards, thickened on its outer edge, insinuate at the base. The sinus is deeper than the siphonal canal, with a slightly raised rim, the entrance contracted. On the inner lip is a callus sheet, thickening at the posterior angle to a tubercle. The siphonal canal is a mere notch.

== Distribution ==
This marine species is endemic to Australia and occurs off Queensland.
