= Splendrillia koruahinensis =

Scientific classification
- Kingdom: Animalia
- Phylum: Mollusca
- Class: Gastropoda
- Subclass: Caenogastropoda
- Order: Neogastropoda
- Superfamily: Conoidea
- Family: Drilliidae
- Genus: Splendrillia
- Species: S. koruahinensis

Binomial name
- Splendrillia koruahinensis (Bartrum & Powell, 1928)

Synonyms
- Austrodrillia koruahinensis Bartrum & Powell, 1928

Extinct species of gastropod

Splendrillia koruahinensis is an extinct species of sea snail, a marine gastropod mollusk in the family Drilliidae.

== Description ==
The length of the holotype (apex broken) attains 23.7 mm, its diameter 8.8 mm.

== Distribution ==
This extinct marine species was endemic to New Zealand.
