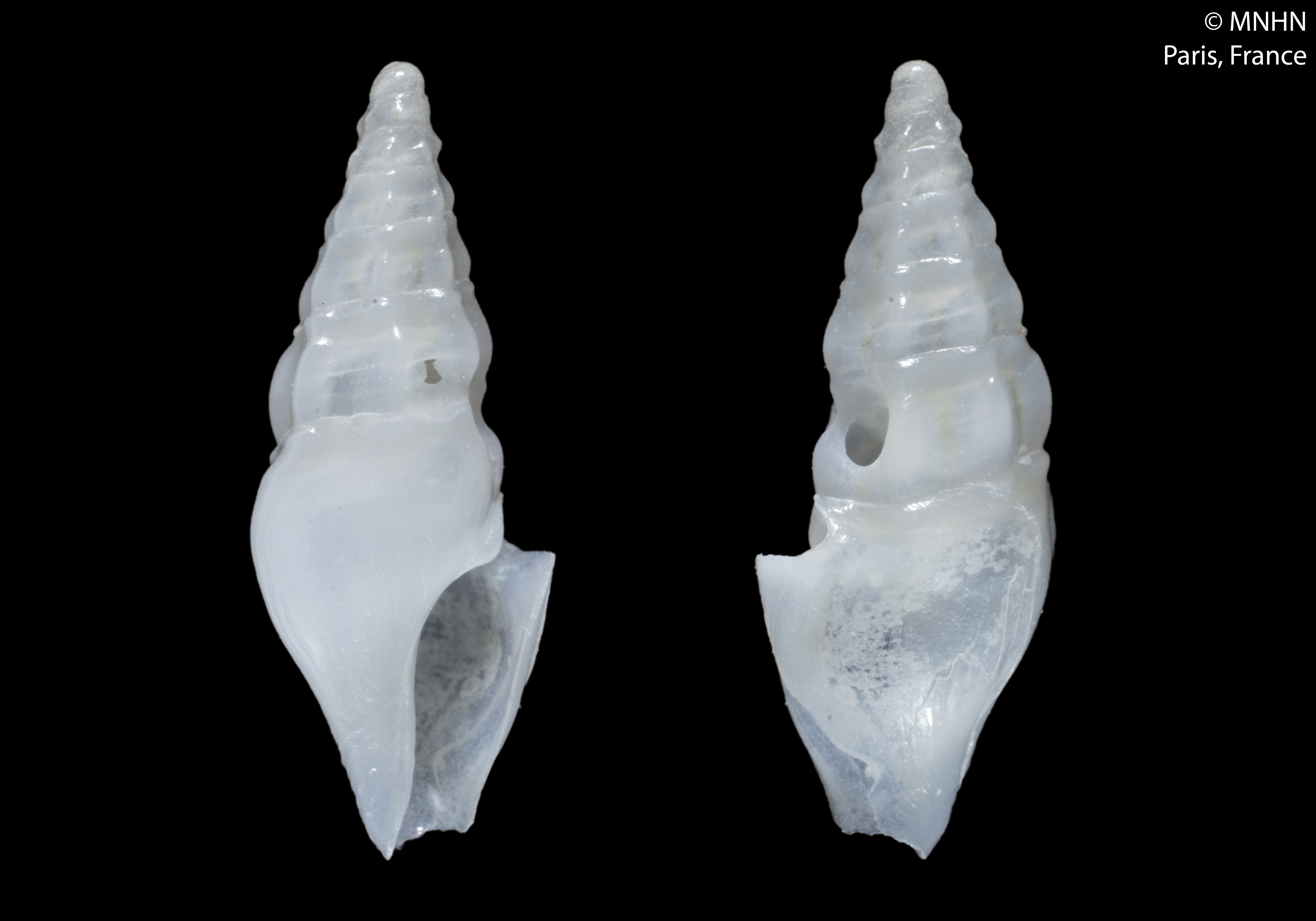
- Shell of Splendrillia boucheti (holotype at MNHN, Paris)

Scientific classification
- Kingdom: Animalia
- Phylum: Mollusca
- Class: Gastropoda
- Subclass: Caenogastropoda
- Order: Neogastropoda
- Superfamily: Conoidea
- Family: Drilliidae
- Genus: Splendrillia
- Species: S. boucheti

Binomial name
- Splendrillia boucheti Wells, 1995

= Splendrillia boucheti =

Species of gastropod

Splendrillia boucheti is a species of sea snail, a marine gastropod mollusk in the family Drilliidae.

== Distribution ==
This marine species occurs off New Caledonia.
