= Splendrillia daviesi =

Scientific classification
- Kingdom: Animalia
- Phylum: Mollusca
- Class: Gastropoda
- Subclass: Caenogastropoda
- Order: Neogastropoda
- Superfamily: Conoidea
- Family: Drilliidae
- Genus: Splendrillia
- Species: S. daviesi

Binomial name
- Splendrillia daviesi Kilburn, 1988

Species of gastropod

Splendrillia daviesi is a species of sea snail, a marine gastropod mollusk in the family Drilliidae.

== Description ==
The length of the shell attains 22.1 mm, its diameter is 7.1 mm.

== Distribution ==
This marine species occurs off the continental slope of South Transkei, South Africa.
