= Splendrillia cruzensis =

Scientific classification
- Kingdom: Animalia
- Phylum: Mollusca
- Class: Gastropoda
- Subclass: Caenogastropoda
- Order: Neogastropoda
- Superfamily: Conoidea
- Family: Drilliidae
- Genus: Splendrillia
- Species: S. cruzensis

Binomial name
- Splendrillia cruzensis Fallon, 2016

Species of sea snail

Splendrillia cruzensis is a species of sea snail, a marine gastropod mollusk in the family Drilliidae.

== Description ==
The length of the shell varies between 2 mm and 13 mm.

== Distribution ==
This marine species occurs off the Virgin Islands.
