= Splendrillia basilirata =

Scientific classification
- Kingdom: Animalia
- Phylum: Mollusca
- Class: Gastropoda
- Subclass: Caenogastropoda
- Order: Neogastropoda
- Superfamily: Conoidea
- Family: Drilliidae
- Genus: Splendrillia
- Species: S. basilirata

Binomial name
- Splendrillia basilirata Sysoev, 1990

Synonyms
- Cymatosyrinx bartschi Haas, 1941 (original combination)

Species of gastropod

Splendrillia basilirata is a species of sea snail, a marine gastropod mollusk in the family Drilliidae.

== Distribution ==
This species occurs in the demersal zone off the Naska and Sala-i-Gomes Ridges, Southeast Pacific Ocean, at depths between 230 m and 750 m.
