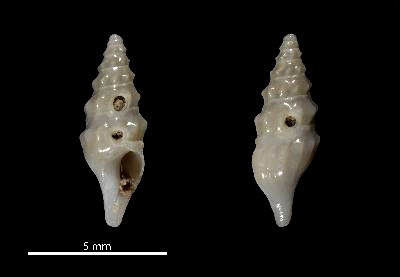
- Shell of Splendrillia powelli (paratype in the MNHN, Paris)

Scientific classification
- Kingdom: Animalia
- Phylum: Mollusca
- Class: Gastropoda
- Subclass: Caenogastropoda
- Order: Neogastropoda
- Superfamily: Conoidea
- Family: Drilliidae
- Genus: Splendrillia
- Species: S. powelli

Binomial name
- Splendrillia powelli Wells, 1990

= Splendrillia powelli =

Species of gastropod

Splendrillia powelli is a species of sea snail, a marine gastropod mollusk in the family Drilliidae.

This species is a junior homonym of † Splendrillia powelli (L. C. King, 1934) -a replacement name will be published.

== Distribution ==
This marine species is endemic to Australia and occurs off Queensland.
