= Splendrillia persica =

Scientific classification
- Kingdom: Animalia
- Phylum: Mollusca
- Class: Gastropoda
- Subclass: Caenogastropoda
- Order: Neogastropoda
- Superfamily: Conoidea
- Family: Drilliidae
- Genus: Splendrillia
- Species: S. persica

Binomial name
- Splendrillia persica (E.A. Smith, 1888)

Synonyms
- Drillia persica (E. A. Smith, 1888); Drillia persica jacintha J.C. Melvill, 1917; Pleurotoma (Drillia) persica E.A. Smith, 1888 (original combination)

Species of gastropod

Splendrillia persica is a species of sea snail, a marine gastropod mollusk in the family Drilliidae.

== Description ==
The length of the fusiform shell attains 9 mm, its diameter 3 mm.

== Distribution ==
This marine species occurs in the Persian Gulf.
