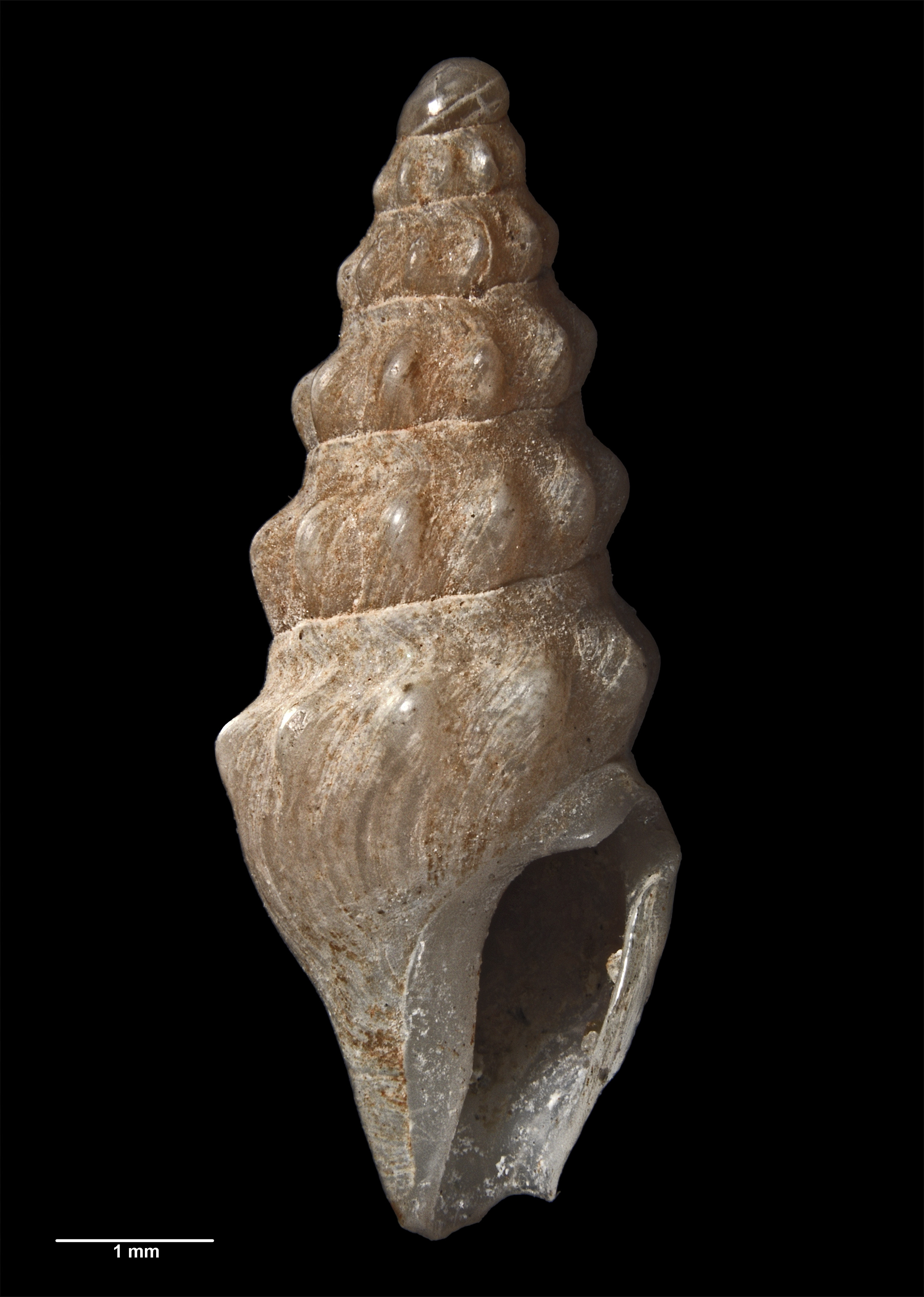
- Splendrillia otagoensis

Scientific classification
- Kingdom: Animalia
- Phylum: Mollusca
- Class: Gastropoda
- Subclass: Caenogastropoda
- Order: Neogastropoda
- Superfamily: Conoidea
- Family: Drilliidae
- Genus: Splendrillia
- Species: S. otagoensis

Binomial name
- Splendrillia otagoensis Powell, 1942

Synonyms
- Austrodrillia nenia (Hedley, 1903); Drillia nenia Hedley, 1903

= Splendrillia otagoensis =

Species of gastropod

Splendrillia otagoensis is a species of sea snail, a marine gastropod mollusk in the family Drilliidae.

== Description ==
The length of the shell attains 7.5 mm, its diameter is 3 mm.

== Distribution ==
This marine species is endemic to New Zealand and occurs off Bay of Plenty, off Oamaru, Otago, and Stewart Island.

== Attributes ==
- Functional group benthos (inherited from Gastropoda)
- Feeding method predator (inherited from Conoidea J. Fleming, 1822)
- Nomenclature code The International Code of Zoological Nomenclature (ICZN) (inherited from Animalia)
