= Splendrillia bratcherae =

Scientific classification
- Kingdom: Animalia
- Phylum: Mollusca
- Class: Gastropoda
- Subclass: Caenogastropoda
- Order: Neogastropoda
- Superfamily: Conoidea
- Family: Drilliidae
- Genus: Splendrillia
- Species: S. bratcherae

Binomial name
- Splendrillia bratcherae McLean & Poorman, 1971

Synonyms
- Fenimorea bratcherae McLean & Poorman, 1971

Species of gastropod

Splendrillia bratcherae is a species of sea snail, a marine gastropod mollusk in the family Drilliidae.

== Description ==
The length of the shell attains 12.3 mm, its diameter 4.1 mm.

== Distribution ==
This marine species occurs from the Sea of Cortez, Western Mexico to Panama.
