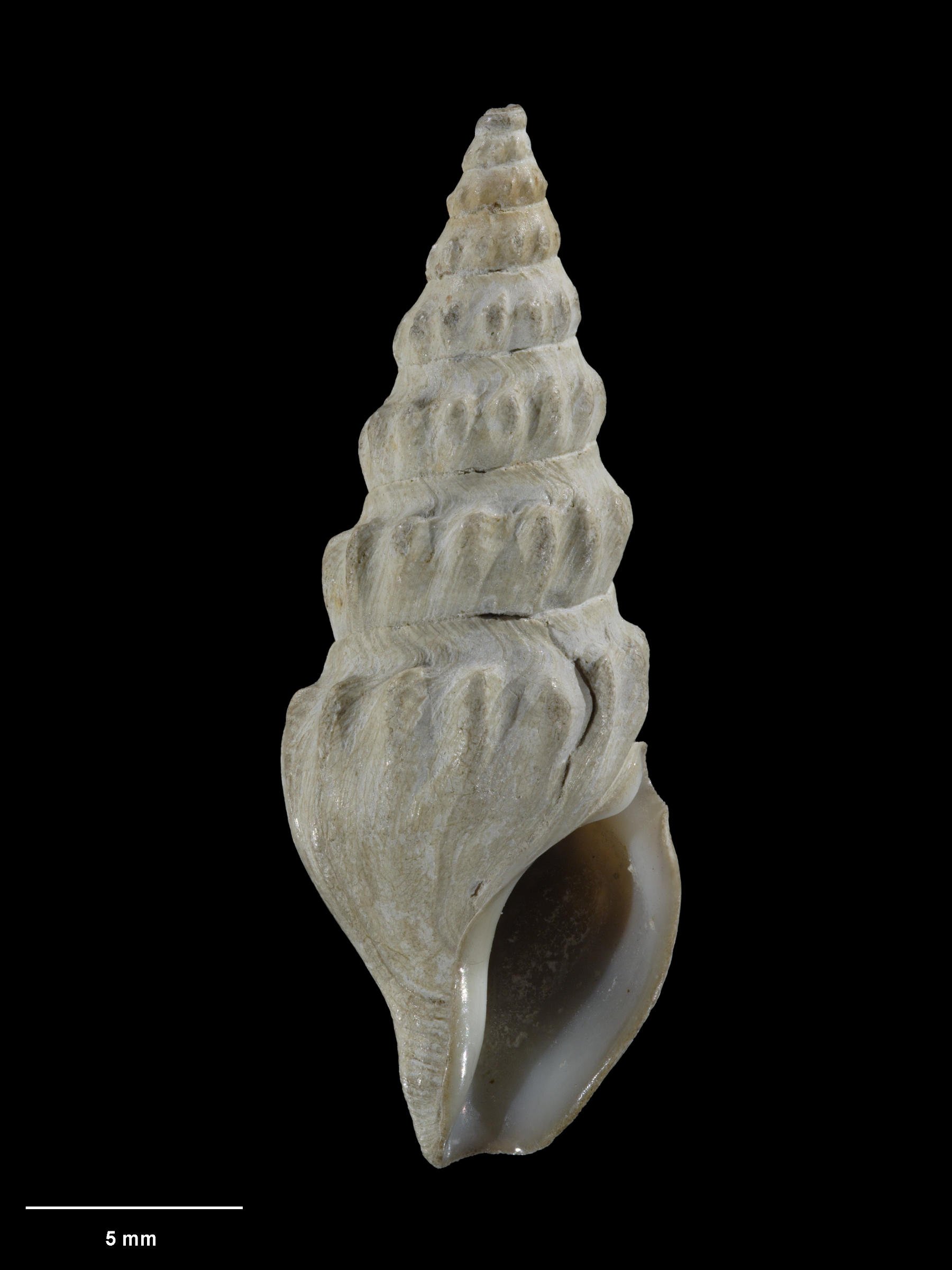
- Marine snail, Splendrillia armata Powell, 1942, collected 11 February 1954, Chatham Rise, New Zealand. Te Papa (M.009789)

Scientific classification
- Kingdom: Animalia
- Phylum: Mollusca
- Class: Gastropoda
- Subclass: Caenogastropoda
- Order: Neogastropoda
- Superfamily: Conoidea
- Family: Drilliidae
- Genus: Splendrillia
- Species: S. armata

Binomial name
- Splendrillia armata Powell, 1942

= Splendrillia armata =

Species of gastropod

Splendrillia armata is a species of sea snail, a marine gastropod mollusk in the family Drilliidae. This species was first described by Baden Powell (malacologist) in 1942 as a fossil from middle Pliocene sediments near Hurunui River.

== Description ==
The height of the shell of the holotype is 14.75 mm; its diameter is 6 mm.

== Distribution ==
This marine species is endemic to New Zealand and occurs off North Island.
