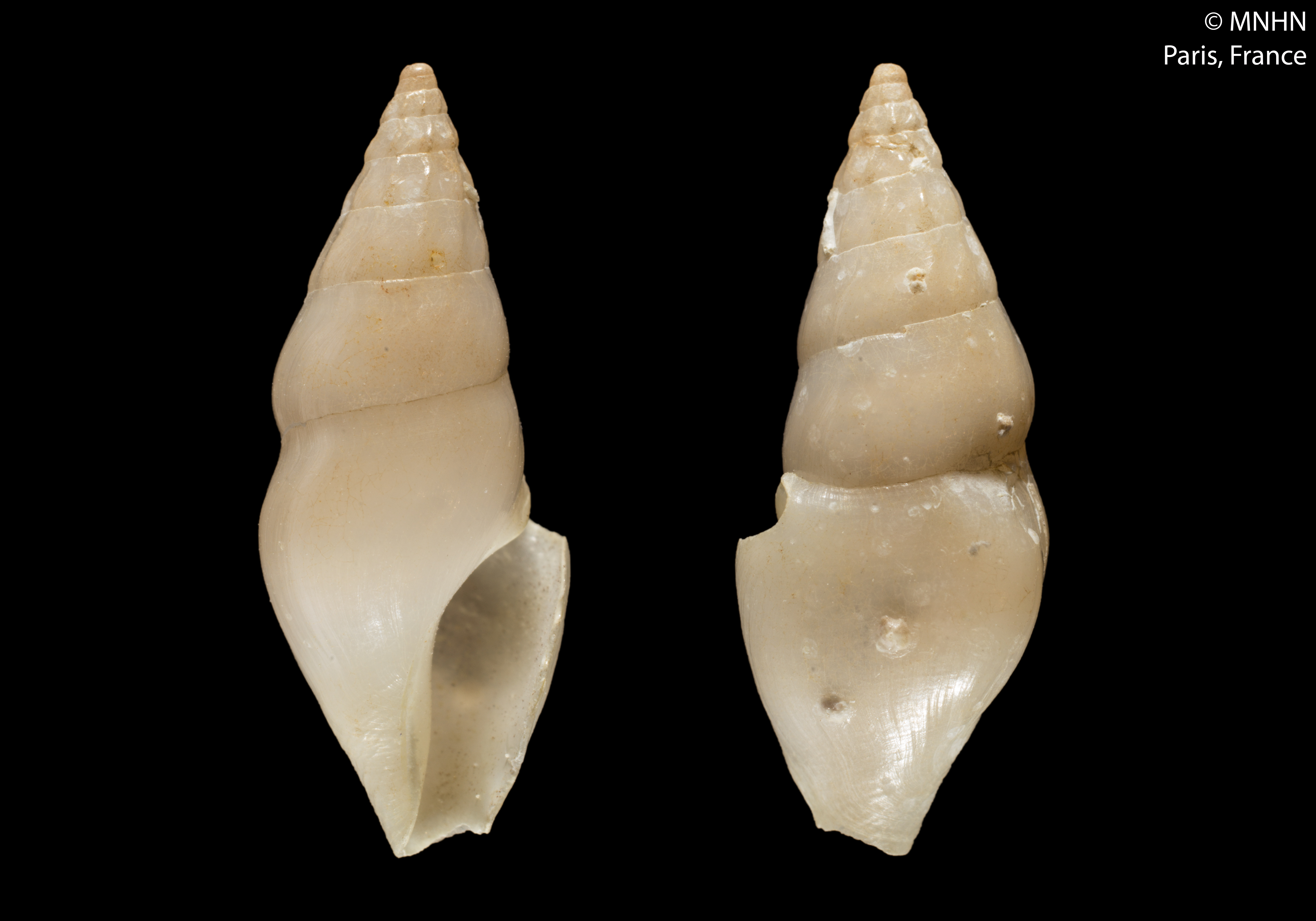
- Shell of Splendrillia globosa (holotype at MNHN, Paris)

Scientific classification
- Kingdom: Animalia
- Phylum: Mollusca
- Class: Gastropoda
- Subclass: Caenogastropoda
- Order: Neogastropoda
- Superfamily: Conoidea
- Family: Drilliidae
- Genus: Splendrillia
- Species: S. globosa

Binomial name
- Splendrillia globosa Wells, 1995

= Splendrillia globosa =

Species of gastropod

Splendrillia globosa is a species of sea snail, a marine gastropod mollusk in the family Drilliidae.

== Description ==
The shell is dirty white to dark brownish, often without indistinct brown colour bands. The shell has 9-10 whorls. The aperture is moderately large. The apertural margin is white and slightly reflective. The umbilicus is wide and mostly covered by the reflective columellar margin.

The width of the shell is 30–90 mm. The height of the shell is 30–55 mm.

== Distribution ==
This marine species occurs off New Caledonia.
