= Splendrillia karukeraensis =

Scientific classification
- Kingdom: Animalia
- Phylum: Mollusca
- Class: Gastropoda
- Subclass: Caenogastropoda
- Order: Neogastropoda
- Superfamily: Conoidea
- Family: Drilliidae
- Genus: Splendrillia
- Species: S. karukeraensis

Binomial name
- Splendrillia karukeraensis Fallon, 2016

Species of gastropod

Splendrillia karukeraensis is a species of sea snail, a marine gastropod mollusk in the family Drilliidae.

== Description ==
The length of the shell attains 12 mm. The snail originally described by Fallon has a fusiform, glossy shell that is truncated anteriorly, and contains 7 1/2 whorls, with the last whorl being approx. 60% of shell length. The species is described as being creamy white with golden-brown bands.

== Distribution ==
This marine species occurs in the Caribbean Sea off Guadeloupe. It was found between 1.2 and 1.8 meters deep in sand around corals.
