= Splendrillia stegeri =

Scientific classification
- Kingdom: Animalia
- Phylum: Mollusca
- Class: Gastropoda
- Subclass: Caenogastropoda
- Order: Neogastropoda
- Superfamily: Conoidea
- Family: Drilliidae
- Genus: Splendrillia
- Species: S. stegeri

Binomial name
- Splendrillia stegeri (Nowell-Usticke, 1959)

Synonyms
- Brachycythara stegeri Nowell-Usticke, 1959 (original combination)

Species of gastropod

Splendrillia stegeri is a species of sea snail, a marine gastropod mollusk in the family Drilliidae.

== Description ==
The length of the shell varies between 4 mm and 6.5 mm.

== Distribution ==
This marine species occurs off the Virgin Islands and Puerto Rico.
