= Crassispira ansonae =

Scientific classification
- Kingdom: Animalia
- Phylum: Mollusca
- Class: Gastropoda
- Subclass: Caenogastropoda
- Order: Neogastropoda
- Superfamily: Conoidea
- Family: Pseudomelatomidae
- Genus: Crassispira
- Species: C. ansonae

Binomial name
- Crassispira ansonae Wells, 1990

Synonyms
- Splendrillia ansonae F.E. Wells, 1990

Species of gastropod

Crassispira ansonae is a species of sea snail, a marine gastropod mollusk in the family Pseudomelatomidae.

== Distribution ==
This marine species is endemic to Australia and occurs off Western Australia.
