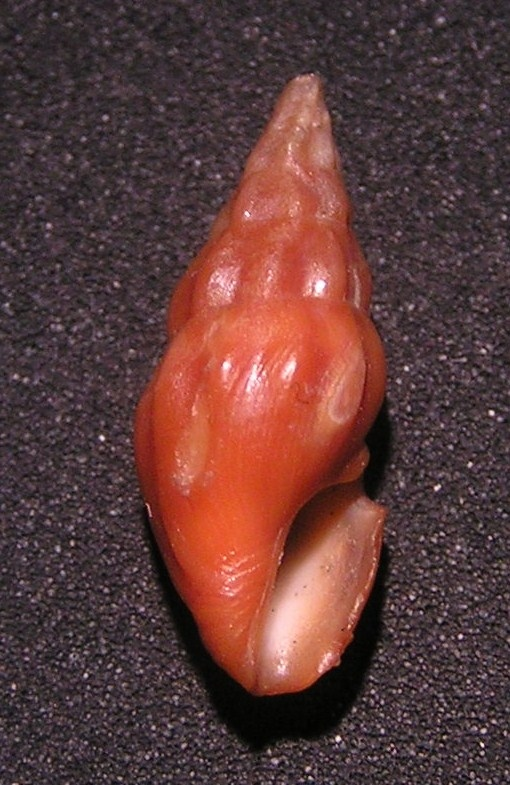
- A shell of Drillia quadrasi

Scientific classification
- Kingdom: Animalia
- Phylum: Mollusca
- Class: Gastropoda
- Subclass: Caenogastropoda
- Order: Neogastropoda
- Superfamily: Conoidea
- Family: Drilliidae
- Genus: Drillia; Gray, 1838

Type species
- Drillia umbilicata Gray, 1838

Species
- See text

Synonyms
- Clavus (Drillia) Gray 1838; Drilla Dollfus, 1911; Drillia (Drillia) Gray, 1838; Pleurotoma (Drillia)

= Drillia =

Genus of gastropods

Drillia is a genus of small sea snails, marine gastropod mollusks in the family Drilliidae.

== General characteristics ==
The shell is turriculated, with an elevated spire, longitudinal ribs, and usually revolving striae. The spiral sculpture of the shell is rather smooth or shows a wide spacing of incised lines. The body whorl is usually short. The columella has a posterior callus. The outer lip is thick, but not varicose, nor dentate within, flexuous, with a well-marked posterior anal sinus near (but not reaching) the suture, and an anterior constriction or sinuosity. The siphonal canal is short, curved and usually narrow. Some species show an interrupted pink banding.

The animal has tentacles approaching at their bases and eyes near their extremities.

== Species ==
Species within the genus Drillia include:

- Drillia acapulcana (Lowe, 1935)
- Drillia adusta (G.B. I Sowerby, 1834)
- † Drillia aegyptiaca Cossmann, 1901
- Drillia aerope (Dall, 1919)
- Drillia albicostata (Sowerby I, 1834)
- Drillia albomaculata (Adams C. B., 1845)
- Drillia alcyonea Melvill & Standen, 1901
- † Drillia allionii Bellardi, 1875
- Drillia altispira Sysoev, 1996
- Drillia amblytera (Bush, 1893)
- † Drillia ammoni Cossmann & Pissarro, 1900
- Drillia angolensis Odhner, 1923
- Drillia annielonae Nolf & Verstraeten, 2007
- Drillia aquatilis (L.A. Reeve, 1845)
- Drillia armilla Barnard, 1958
- Drillia asra Thiele, 1925
- Drillia athyrma Melvill, J.C. & R. Standen, 1901
- Drillia audax Melvill & Standen, 1903
- Drillia ballista Von Maltzan, 1883
- Drillia barkliensis H. Adams, 1869
- † Drillia bonneti Cossmann, 1900
- † Drillia boussaci Cossmann, 1913
- † Drillia brocchii (Bellardi & Michelotti, 1841)
- Drillia bruchia Barnard, 1958
- Drillia bruuni Knudsen, 1952
- Drillia caffra (Smith E. A., 1882)
- † Drillia calvimontensis Cossman, 1889
- Drillia capta E.A. Smith, 1899
- Drillia captiva E.A. Smith, 1899
- Drillia cecchii Jousseaume, 1891
- Drillia clionellaeformis (Weinkauff & Kobelt, 1875)
- Drillia collina Barnard, 1958
- Drillia concolor Smith E.A., 1877
- Drillia connelli Kilburn, 1988
- † Drillia constantinensis Cossmann & Pissarro, 1900
- Drillia corusca Reeve, 1843
- Drillia cratista Melvill J.C., 1927
- Drillia cunninghamae McLean & Poorman, 1971
- † Drillia cureti Cossmann, 1919
- Drillia cuyoensis Bozzetti, 2020
- Drillia dakarensis Knudsen, 1956
- Drillia dejecta Smith E.A., 1888
- Drillia diasi Barnard, 1958
- Drillia dives Melvill, J.C. & R. Standen, 1903
- † Drillia douvillei Basse, 1932
- Drillia dovyalis Barnard, 1969
- Drillia dunkeri (Weinkauff, 1876)
- Drillia eborea A.A. Gould, 1860
- † Drillia edulcorata Cossmann & Pissarro, 1900
- Drillia enna (Dall, 1918)
- Drillia erepta Barnard, 1969
- Drillia euchroes Melvill, J.C., 1912
- † Drillia ferenuda Cossmann, 1900
- Drillia fijiensis E.A. Smith, 1888
- Drillia fraga H.B. Preston, 1908
- Drillia ghyooti Nolf, 2008
- Drillia gibberulus (Hervier, 1896)
- Drillia griffithii (Reeve, 1843)
- Drillia havanensis (Dall, 1881)
- Drillia idalinae Bernard & Nicolay, 1984
- Drillia inchoata (Sturany, R., 1903)
- Drillia indra Thiele, 1925
- Drillia inexspectata K. Martin, 1895
- Drillia inornata McLean & Poorman, 1971
- Drillia investigatoris Smith E. A., 1899
- † Drillia ischnocolpa Cossmann & Pissarro, 1900
- Drillia janseni H. Strebel, 1905
- Drillia katiae Nolf, 2006
- Drillia knudseni Tippett, 2006
- Drillia kophameli Strebel, 1905
- Drillia latisulcus Barnard, 1958
- Drillia lea Thiele, 1925
- † Drillia leptoides (de Boury, 1899)
- Drillia levanderi R. Sturany, 1905
- Drillia lignaria (Sowerby III, 1903)
- Drillia macilenta (Melvill, 1923)
- Drillia macleani Tucker J., 1992
- Drillia maculomarginata Kilburn & Stahlschmidt, 2012
- Drillia meridiana Perugia & Prelle, 2012
- Drillia monodi Knudsen, 1952
- Drillia nodilirata E.A. Smith, 1877
- Drillia ochroleuca J.C. Melvill & E.R. Sykes, 1897
- Drillia oleacina (Dall, 1881)
- Drillia oliverai Kilburn & Stahlschmidt, 2012
- Drillia omanensis Melvill, J.C. & R. Standen, 1901
- Drillia patriciae Bernard & Nicolay, 1984
- Drillia philotima J.C. Melvill & R. Standen, 1903
- Drillia phymaticus R.B. Watson, 1885
- Drillia poecila Sysoev & Bouchet, 2001
- Drillia potti (R. Sturany, 1903)
- Drillia prattii E.A. Smith, 1877
- Drillia pselia Barnard, 1958
- Drillia pyramidata (Kiener, 1840)
- Drillia quadrasi O. Böttger, 1895
- Drillia recordata (E.R. Sykes, 1905)
- Drillia regia (Habe & Murakami, 1970)
- Drillia rimata E.A. Smith, 1888
- Drillia rosacea (Reeve, 1845)
- Drillia roseola (Hertlein & Strong, 1955)
- Drillia rosolina (Marrat, 1877)
- Drillia rubrozonata M.M. Schepman, 1913
- Drillia rufescens R.W. Dunker, 1871
- Drillia sesquitertia E.C. Von Martens, 1904
- Drillia siebenrocki (Sturany, 1900)
- Drillia sikesi H.B. Preston, 1908
- Drillia sinuosa (Montagu, 1803)
- Drillia sowerbyi W.H. Turton, 1932
- Drillia spirostachys Kilburn, 1988
- Drillia suxdorfi Strebel, 1905
- † Drillia terebra (Basterot, 1825)
- Drillia tholos Barnard, 1958
- Drillia tripter Von Maltzan, 1883
- Drillia tumida McLean & Poorman, 1971
- † Drillia turrella (Lamarck, 1804)
- Drillia umbilicata Gray, 1838
- Drillia valida McLean & Poorman, 1971
- Drillia worthingtoni E.A. Smith, 1904

Nomen dubium

- Drillia signa Bartsch, 1915

Species inquirenda

- Drillia ganjamensis Preston, 1910
- Drillia mariesi Melvill & Standen, 1897

Nomen nudum

- Drillia alata H. Adams & A. Adams, 1853

== Species brought into synonymy ==
This is a long list of synonyms of Drillia
- Drillia acestra Dall, 1889: synonym of Compsodrillia acestra (Dall, 1889)
- Drillia achatina Verco, 1909: synonym of Austrodrillia dimidiata (G. B. Sowerby III, 1896)
- Drillia acloneta W. H. Dall, 1889: synonym of Inodrillia acloneta (W. H. Dall, 1889)
- Drillia acrybia Dall, 1889: synonym of Inodrillia acrybia (Dall, 1889)
- Drillia actinocycla Dall & Simpson, 1901: synonym of Strombus pugilis Linnaeus, 1758
- Drillia acucincta W. H. Dall, 1890: synonym of Zonulispira crocata (L. A. Reeve, 1845)
- †Drillia acurugata Dall, 1890: synonym of †Strictispira acurugata (Dall, 1890)
- †Drillia acutangularis (Deshayes, 1834): synonym of †Drilliola turrella (Lamarck, 1804)
- †Drillia adriani (Dollfuss, 1899): synonym of Crassispira (Tripia) sulcata adriani (Dollfus, 1899)
- Drillia aemula Angas, 1877: synonym of Inquisitor aemula (Angas, 1877)
- Drillia aepynota Dall, 1889: synonym of Inodrillia aepynota (Dall, 1889)
- †Drillia aequistriata Hutton, 1885: synonym of †Splendrillia aequistriata (Hutton, 1885)
- Drillia aesopus Schepman, 1913: synonym of Inquisitor aesopus (Schepman, 1913)
- Drillia agnewia Tenison-Woods, 1879: synonym of Vexitomina coxi (Angas, 1867)
- Drillia agrestis Verco, 1909: synonym of Austrodrillia agrestis (Verco, 1909)
- Drillia alabaster (Reeve, 1843): synonym of Inquisitor alabaster (Reeve, 1843)
- Drillia albanyana W. H. Turton, 1932: synonym of Striatoguraleus thetis (E. A. Smith, 1904) (possible junior synonym)
- Drillia albicoma Dall, 1889: synonym of Neodrillia albicoma (Dall, 1889)
- Drillia albiguttata Pilsbry, 1904: synonym of Pilsbryspira albiguttata (Pilsbry, 1904)
- Drillia albinodata (Reeve, 1846): synonym of Pilsbryspira albinodata (Reeve, 1846)
- Drillia albonodosa Carpenter, 1857: synonym of Compsodrillia albonodosa (Carpenter, 1857)
- Drillia albonodulosa E. A. Smith, 1904: synonym of Psittacodrillia albonodulosa (E. A. Smith, 1904)
- Drillia albotessellata E. A. Smith, 1906: synonym of Nquma rousi (Sowerby III, 1886)
- Drillia alesidota Dall, 1889: synonym of Hindsiclava alesidota (Dall, 1889)
- Drillia algoensis Barnard, K.H., 1958: synonym of Drillia erepta Barnard, K.H., 1969
- Drillia alluaudi Dautzenberg, 1932: synonym of Paradrillia alluaudi (Dautzenberg, 1932)
- Drillia amanda E. A. Smith, 1882: synonym of Drillia sinuosa (G. Montagu, 1803)
- Drillia amblytera K.J. Bush, 1893: synonym of Inodrillia amblytera (K.J. Bush, 1893)
- Drillia ancilla Thiele, 1925: synonym of Orrmaesia ancilla (Thiele, 1925)
- Drillia angasi (Crosse, 1863): synonym of Austrodrillia angasi (Crosse, 1863)
- †Drillia angulosa G.P. Deshayes, 1834: synonym of †Crassispira angulosa G.P. Deshayes, 1834
- Drillia antiguensis P. Bartsch, 1943: synonym of Neodrillia cydia (P. Bartsch, 1943)
- Drillia appressa Carpenter, 1864: synonym of Crassispira appressa (Carpenter, 1864)
- †Drillia (Crassispira) armoricensis Cossmann, 1896: synonym of †Crassispira armoricensis (Cossmann, 1896)
- Drillia aterrima (G. B. Sowerby I, 1834): synonym of Pilsbryspira aterrima (Sowerby I, 1834)
- Drillia atkinsoni Tenison-Woods, 1876: synonym of Etrema denseplicata (Dunker, 1871)
- Drillia auberti Lamy, 1934: synonym of Pilsbryspira auberti (Lamy, 1934)
- Drillia auriculifera Lamarck, 1816: synonym of Clavus canalicularis (Röding, 1798)
- Drillia aurora Thiele, 1925: synonym of Splendrillia aurora (Thiele, 1925)
- Drillia bairstowi (G. B. Sowerby III, 1886): synonym of Psittacodrillia bairstowi (Sowerby III, 1886)
- Drillia bandata Nowell-Usticke, 1971: synonym of Crassispira latizonata (E. A. Smith, 1882)
- Drillia batjanensis Schepman, 1913: synonym of Maoritomella batjanensis (Schepman, 1913)
- Drillia baynhami Melvill & Standen, 1901: synonym of Ptychobela baynhami (Smith, E.A., 1891)
- Drillia bealiana (Schwengel & McGinty, 1942): synonym of Douglassia bealiana Schwengel & McGinty, 1942
- Drillia bednalli G. B. Sowerby III, 1896: synonym of Splendrillia bednalli (G. B. Sowerby III, 1896)
- Drillia beraudiana (Crosse, 1863): synonym of Austrodrillia beraudiana (Crosse, 1863)
- Drillia berryi McLean & Poorman, 1971: synonym of Clathrodrillia berryi (McLean & Poorman, 1971)
- Drillia bijubata (Reeve, 1843): synonym of Turridrupa bijubata (Reeve, 1843)
- Drillia blacki (Petuch, 2004): synonym of Fenimorea moseri (Dall, 1889)
- Drillia blakensis Tippett, 2007: synonym of Clathrodrillia blakensis (Tippett, 2007)
- Drillia bottae (Valenciennes in Kiener, 1839): synonym of Crassispira bottae (Valenciennes in Kiener, 1839)
- Drillia braziliensis E. A. Smith, 1915: synonym of Carinodrillia braziliensis (E. A. Smith, 1915)
- †Drillia brevicauda (Deshayes, 1834): synonym of † Turricula brevicauda (Deshayes, 1834)
- †Drillia brevicula (Deshayes, 1834): synonym of †:Eopleurotoma brevicula (Deshayes, 1834)
- Drillia burnupi (G. B. Sowerby III, 1897): synonym of Clavus burnupi (G. B. Sowerby III, 1897)
- Drillia cancellata Carpenter, 1864: synonym of Ophiodermella cancellata (Carpenter, 1864)
- Drillia cancellata (Beddome, 1883): synonym of Exomilus cancellata (Beddome, 1883)
- Drillia candens E. A. Smith, 1879: synonym of Clavus candens (E. A. Smith, 1879)
- Drillia canna W. H. Dall, 1889: synonym of Compsodrillia canna (W. H. Dall, 1889)
- Drillia carmen G. B. Sowerby III, 1916: synonym of Inquisitor carmen (G. B. Sowerby III, 1916)
- Drillia carnicolor Hervier, 1896: synonym of Otitoma carnicolor (Hervier, 1896)
- Drillia centimata Dall, 1889: synonym of Spirotropis centimata (Dall, 1889)
- Drillia cerithoidea Carpenter, 1857: synonym of Crassispira cerithoidea (Carpenter, 1857)
- Drillia chaaci Espinosa & Rolán, 1995: synonym of Fenimorea chaaci (Espinosa & Rolán, 1995)
- Drillia chazaliei Dautzenberg, 1900: synonym of Crassispira chazaliei (Dautzenberg, 1900)
- Drillia chordata Suter, 1908: synonym of Aoteadrillia wanganuiensis (Hutton, 1873)
- Drillia circumvertens Melvill & Standen, 1901: synonym of Microdrillia circumvertens (Melvill & Standen, 1901)
- Drillia claudoni Dautzenberg, 1900: synonym of Glyphostoma claudoni (Dautzenberg, 1900)
- Drillia clavata G. B. Sowerby II, 1870: synonym of Clavus clavata (G. B. Sowerby II, 1870)
- Drillia clydonia Melvill & Standen, 1901: synonym of Splendrillia clydonia (Melvill & Standen, 1901)
- Drillia collaris (G. B. Sowerby I, 1834): synonym of Pilsbryspira collaris (Sowerby I, 1834)
- Drillia commentica Hedley, 1915: synonym of Microdrillia commentica (Hedley, 1915)
- Drillia confusa Seguenza, G., 1880: synonym of Spirotropis confusa (Seguenza, 1880)
- Drillia consociata (Smith E.A., 1877): synonym of Crassispira consociata (E. A. Smith, 1877)
- Drillia continua J. C. Melvill & R. Standen, 1903: synonym of Haedropleura continua (Melvill, J.C. & R. Standen, 1903)
- Drillia corrugata (Sowerby, G.B. I, 1834): synonym of Crassispira turricula (G. B. Sowerby I, 1834)
- †Drillia costaria (Lamarck, 1804): synonym of †Crassispira costaria (Lamarck, 1804)
- Drillia costicapitata Verco, 1909: synonym of Pseudexomilus costicapitata (Verco, 1909)
- Drillia coxi Angas, 1867: synonym of Vexitomina coxi (Angas, 1867)
- Drillia crassa (Smith E.A., 1888): synonym of Clavus aglaia (Dall, 1918)
- Drillia crebrespirata Verco, 1909: synonym of Filodrillia crebrespirata (Verco, 1909)
- Drillia crenularis (Lamarck, 1816): synonym of Ptychobela nodulosa (Gmelin, 1791)
- Drillia crocata L. A. Reeve, 1845: synonym of Zonulispira crocata (L. A. Reeve, 1845)
- Drillia cubana Melvill, 1923: synonym of Crassispira cubana (Melvill, 1923)
- †Drillia curvicosta (Lamarck, 1804): synonym of †Eopleurotoma curvicosta (Lamarck, 1804)
- Drillia cydia (Bartsch, 1943): synonym of Neodrillia cydia Bartsch, 1943
- Drillia cygnea Melvill & Standen, 1897: synonym of Clavus cygnea (Melvill & Standen, 1897)
- Drillia dalli (Verrill & Smith, 1882): synonym of Inodrillia dalli (Verrill & S. Smith [in Verrill], 1882)
- Drillia dautzenbergi Tippett, 1995: synonym of Clathrodrillia dautzenbergi (Tippett, 1995)
- Drillia decenna W. H. Dall, 1908: synonym of Clavus clavata (G. B. I Sowerby, 1870)
- †Drillia decussata (Lamarck, 1804): synonym of †Eopleurotoma baylei (de BOURY, 1899)
- Drillia denseplicata Dunker, 1871: synonym of Etrema denseplicata (Dunker, 1871)
- Drillia detecta (Dall, 1881): synonym of Pleurotomella circumvoluta (Watson, 1881)
- Drillia dilecta Hedley, 1903: synonym of Tomopleura dilecta (Hedley, 1903)
- Drillia dimidiata G. B. Sowerby III, 1896: synonym of Austrodrillia dimidiata (G. B. Sowerby III, 1896)
- Drillia discors G.B. Sowerby I, 1834: synonym of Crassispira discors (Sowerby I, 1834)
- Drillia disjecta (Smith, E.A., 1888): synonym of Splendrillia disjecta (E. A. Smith, 1888)
- Drillia distincta Thiele J., 1925: synonym of Inkinga platystoma (E. A. Smith, 1877)
- Drillia diversa (E. A. Smith, 1882): synonym of Psittacodrillia diversa (E. A. Smith, 1882)
- Drillia dolorosa Thiele, 1925: synonym of Filodrillia dolorosa (Thiele, 1925)
- Drillia dunkeri Knudsen, 1952: synonym of Drillia knudseni Tippett, 2006
- Drillia eburnea P.P. Carpenter, 1865: synonym of Pseudomelatoma penicillata (P.P. Carpenter, 1865)
- Drillia echinata: synonym of Clavus flammulatus Montfort, 1810
- Drillia elevata (Smith E.A., 1884): synonym of Citharomangelia elevata (Smith E.A., 1884)
- Drillia empyrosia Dall, 1899: synonym of Elaeocyma empyrosia (Dall, 1899)
- Drillia enae (Bartsch, 1934): synonym of Douglassia enae Bartsch, 1934
- Drillia encia P. Bartsch, 1943: synonym of Neodrillia cydia (P. Bartsch, 1943)
- †Drillia (Crassipira) erronea Cossmann, 1902: synonym of †Crassispira erronea (Cossmann, 1902)
- Drillia essingtonensis (Smith, 1888): synonym of Inquisitor mastersi (Brazier, 1876)
- Drillia eucosmia Dall, 1889: synonym of Compsodrillia eucosmia (Dall, 1889)
- †Drillia eupora W. H. Dall, 1915: synonym of * †Hindsiclava eupora (W. H. Dall, 1915)
- Drillia eva Thiele, 1925: synonym of Splendrillia eva (Thiele, 1925)
- Drillia exasperata (Reeve, 1843): synonym of Clavus exasperatus (Reeve, 1843)
- Drillia exsculpta R.B. Watson, 1882: synonym of Belomitra pourtalesii (W. H. Dall, 1881)
- Drillia exilis Pease, 1868: synonym of Clavus exilis (Pease, 1868)
- Drillia falcicosta Barnard, 1958: synonym of Clavus falcicosta (Barnard, 1958)
- Drillia falsa Barnard, 1958: synonym of Splendrillia falsa (Barnard, 1958)
- Drillia fancherae W. H. Dall, 1903: synonym of Ophiodermella fancherae (W. H. Dall, 1903)
- Drillia fanoa W. H. Dall, 1927: synonym of Compsodrillia fanoa (W. H. Dall, 1927)
- Drillia flavidula: synonym of Clathrodrillia flavidula (Lamarck, 1822)
- Drillia flavonodulosa E. A. Smith, 1879: synonym of Crassispira flavonodulosa (E. A. Smith, 1879)
- Drillia flucki Brown & Pilsbry, 1913: synonym of Pilsbryspira flucki (Brown & Pilsbry, 1913)
- Drillia fortilirata E. A. Smith, 1879: synonym of Pseudoetrema fortilirata (E. A. Smith, 1879)
- Drillia fossata (G. B. Sowerby III, 1903): synonym of Tropidoturris fossata (Sowerby III, 1903)
- Drillia fugata E. A. Smith, 1895: synonym of Paradrillia fugata (E. A. Smith, 1895)
- Drillia fultoni (G. B. Sowerby III, 1888): synonym of Pulsarella fultoni (G. B. Sowerby III, 1888)
- †Drillia furcata (Lamarck, 1804): synonym of †Crassispira furcata (Lamarck, 1804)
- †Drillia fuscescens (Gray, 1843): synonym of Crassispira fuscescens (Reeve, 1843)
- Drillia fusconitens G. B. Sowerby III, 1901: synonym of Clavus fusconitens (G. B. Sowerby III, 1901)
- †Drillia fusiformis Hutton, 1877: synonym of †Comitas fusiformis (Hutton, 1877)
- Drillia gabrieli Pritchard & Gatliff, 1899: synonym of Paracuneus immaculatus (Tenison-Woods, 1876)
- Drillia gatliffi Verco, 1909: synonym of Scrinium gatliffi (Verco, 1909)
- Drillia gibbosa (Born, 1778): synonym of Clathrodrillia gibbosa (Born, 1778)
- †Drillia (Crassispira) glaphyrella Cossmann & PIissarro, 1900: synonym of †Crassispira glaphyrella (Cossmann & PIissarro, 1900)
- Drillia granatella Melvill & Standen, 1903: synonym of Splendrillia granatella (Melvill & Standen, 1903)
- Drillia gratiosa G. B. Sowerby III, 1896: synonym of Splendrillia gratiosa (G. B. Sowerby III, 1896)
- Drillia greeleyi Dall, 1901: synonym of Crassispira greeleyi (Dall, 1901)
- Drillia gundlachi Dall & Simpson, 1901: synonym of Compsodrillia gundlachi (Dall & Simpson, 1901)
- Drillia hadfieldi J. C. Melvill & R. Standen, 1895: synonym of Pseudodaphnella hadfieldi (J. C. Melvill & R. Standen, 1895)
- Drillia halidoma Bartsch, P., 1915: synonym of Clionella semicostata (Kiener, 1840)
- Drillia haliostrephis Dall, 1889: synonym of Compsodrillia haliostrephis (Dall, 1889)
- Drillia harpularia (Desmoulins, 1842): synonym of Crassispira harpularia (Desmoulins, 1842)
- Drillia haswelli Hedley, 1907: synonym of Filodrillia haswelli (Hedley, 1907)
- Drillia hecatorgnia Verco, 1907: synonym of Bathytoma hecatorgnia (Verco, 1907)
- Drillia hedleyi Verco, 1909: synonym of Inquisitor hedleyi (Verco, 1909)
- †Drillia hispaniolae C.J. Maury, 1917: synonym of †Crassispira hispaniolae C.J. Maury, 1917
- Drillia hololeuca N.H. Odhner, 1917: synonym of Inquisitor spicata (R. B. Hinds, 1843)
- Drillia hottentota (E. A. Smith, 1882): synonym of Clavus hottentotus (E. A. Smith, 1882)
- Drillia howitti Pritchard & Gatliff, 1899: synonym of Splendrillia woodsi (Beddome, 1883)
- Drillia humilis E. A. Smith, 1879: synonym of Clavus humilis (E. A. Smith, 1879)
- †Drillia hypermeces Cossmann, 1889: synonym of †Crassispira hypermeces (Cossmann, 1889)
- †Drillia hypoglypta Fontannes, 1880: synonym of †Belidaphne hypoglypta (Fontannes, 1880)
- Drillia immaculata (Tenison-Woods, 1876): synonym of Paracuneus immaculatus (Tenison-Woods, 1876)
- Drillia incerta (Smith E. A., 1877): synonym of Inquisitor incertus (E. A. Smith, 1877)
- Drillia incilis R.B. Watson, 1881: synonym of Glyphostoma gratula (W. H. Dall, 1881)
- Drillia incisa Carpenter, 1864: synonym of Ophiodermella inermis (Reeve, 1843)
- †Drillia incrassata (Dujardin, 1837): synonym of Crassopleura maravignae (Bivona Ant. in Bivona And., 1838)
- Drillia incrusta Tenison-Woods, 1877: synonym of Guraleus incrusta (Tenison-Woods, 1877)
- †Drillia (Crassispira) inflexa (Lamarck, 1804): synonym of †Crassispira tuckeri Le Renard, 1994
- Drillia infrafusca (Sowerby, G.B. III, 1893): synonym of Clavus infrafusca (Sowerby, G.B. III, 1893)
- Drillia inimica (Dall, 1927): synonym of Clathrodrillia inimica Dall, 1927
- Drillia innocens Melvill, 1923: synonym of Splendrillia interpunctata (E. A. Smith, 1882)
- Drillia insignita Melvill, 1923: synonym of Inquisitor insignita (Melvill, 1923)
- Drillia intermaculata E. A. Smith, 1879: synonym of Splendrillia intermaculata (E. A. Smith, 1879)
- Drillia interpleura Dall & Simpson, 1901: synonym of Buchema interpleura (Dall & Simpson, 1901)
- Drillia interpunctata Smith E.A., 1882: synonym of Splendrillia coccinata (Reeve, 1845)
- Drillia intertincta Smith E.A., 1877: synonym of Inquisitor intertincta (Smith E.A., 1877)
- Drillia ione Melvill & Standen, 1896: synonym of Anacithara ione (Melvill & Standen, 1896)
- †Drillia (Crassispira) ischnomorpha Cossmann & Pissarro, 1900: synonym of †Crassispira ischnomorpha (Cossmann & Pissarro, 1900)
- Drillia jaffaensis Verco, 1909: synonym of Epideira jaffaensis (Verco, 1909)
- Drillia jamaicensis P. Bartsch, 1943: synonym of Neodrillia cydia (P. Bartsch, 1943)
- Drillia japonica Lischke, 1869: synonym of Clavus japonicus (Lischke, 1869)
- Drillia jeffreysii E. A. Smith, 1875: synonym of Inquisitor jeffreysii (E. A. Smith, 1875)
- Drillia jousseaumei Dautzenberg, 1900: synonym of Lioglyphostoma jousseaumei (Dautzenberg, 1900)
- Drillia kennicotti Dall, 1871: synonym of Suavodrillia kennicotti (Dall, 1871)
- Drillia kleinrosa Nowell-Usticke, 1969: synonym of Miraclathurella kleinrosa (Nowell-Usticke, 1969)
- Drillia kwandangensis Schepman, 1913: synonym of Thelecytharella kwandangensis (Schepman, 1913)
- †Drillia (Crassispira) labroplicata Cossmann, 1896: synonym of †Crassispira labroplicata (Cossmann, 1896)
- Drillia lacteola Verco, 1909: synonym of Filodrillia lacteola (Verco, 1909)
- Drillia laeta (Hinds, 1843): synonym of Clavus laetus (Hinds, 1843)
- Drillia lanceolata (Reeve, 1845): synonym of Clathrodrillia flavidula (Lamarck, 1822)
- Drillia lara Bartsch, 1915: synonym of Drillia caffra (E. A. Smith, 1882)
- Drillia laterculata (Sowerby II, 1870): synonym of Inquisitor laterculata (Sowerby II, 1870)
- Drillia laterculoides Barnard, 1958: synonym of Funa laterculoides (Barnard, 1958)
- Drillia latiriformis Melvill, 1923: synonym of Crassispira latiriformis (Melvill, 1923)
- Drillia lauta Pease, 1868: synonym of Clavus lamberti (Montrouzier, 1860)
- †Drillia (Tripia) lavillei (de Boury, 1899): synonym of †Crassispira lavillei (de Boury, 1899)
- Drillia layardi (G. B. Sowerby III, 1897): synonym of Crassiclava layardi (Sowerby III, 1897)
- Drillia legrandi Beddome, 1883: synonym of Asperdaphne legrandi (Beddome, 1883)
- Drillia leucocyma Dall, 1884: synonym of Pilsbryspira leucocyma (Dall, 1884)
- †Drillia limonetta Olsson, 1922: synonym of Strombina recurva (G. B. Sowerby I, 1832)
- Drillia limonitella Dall, 1884: synonym of Kurtziella limonitella (Dall, 1884)
- Drillia lithoria Melvill & Standen, 1903: synonym of Paradrillia lithoria (Melvill & Standen, 1903)
- Drillia livida Hedley, 1909: synonym of Clavus exasperatus (Reeve, 1843)
- Drillia longispira E. A. Smith, 1879: synonym of Leiocithara longispira (E. A. Smith, 1879)
- †Drillia losquemadica Maury 1917: synonym of †Crassispira losquemadica Maury 1917
- Drillia lucida Nevill & Nevill, 1875: synonym of Splendrillia lucida (Nevill & Nevill, 1875)
- Drillia luctuosa (Hinds, 1843): synonym of Clavatula luctuosa Hinds, 1843
- Drillia lyallensis Murdoch, 1905: synonym of Neoguraleus lyallensis (Murdoch, 1905)
- Drillia madurensis Schepman, 1913: synonym of Horaiclavus madurensis (Schepman, 1913)
- Drillia maorum E. A. Smith, 1877: synonym of Antimelatoma buchanani (Hutton, 1873)
- †Drillia margaritula (Deshayes, 1834): synonym of †Crassispira margaritula (Deshayes, 1834)
- Drillia marmarina (Watson, 1881): synonym of Fenimorea marmarina (Watson, 1881)
- †Drillia mausseneti (Cossmann, 1889): synonym of †Crassispira mausseneti (Cossmann, 1889)
- Drillia melonesiana Dall & Simpson, 1901: synonym of Crassispira melonesiana (Dall & Simpson, 1901)
- †Drillia merriami Arnold, 1903: synonym of Borsonella merriami (Arnold, 1903)
- †Drillia mesomorhpa Cossmann, 1889: synonym of †Crassispira nana (Deshayes, 1834)
- Drillia metcalfei Angas, 1867: synonym of Vexitomina metcalfei (Angas, 1867)
- Drillia microscelida W. H. Dall, 1895: synonym of Gemmula microscelida (W. H. Dall, 1895)
- Drillia minor Seguenza, 1880 (invalid);: synonym of Clathrodrillia dautzenbergi (D.L. Tippett, 1995)
- Drillia minuta Tenison-Woods, 1877: synonym of Nepotilla minuta (Tenison-Woods, 1877)
- Drillia minutissima Garrett, 1873: synonym of Carinapex minutissima (Garrett, 1873)
- Drillia moesta Carpenter, 1864: synonym of Pseudomelatoma moesta (Carpenter, 1864)
- Drillia monilifera Carpenter, 1857: synonym of Crassispira monilifera (Carpenter, 1857)
- Drillia morgana Barnard, 1958: synonym of Antiguraleus morgana (Barnard, 1958)
- Drillia moseri Dall, 1889: synonym of Fenimorea moseri (Dall, 1889)
- Drillia multilirata Hedley, C. 1903: synonym of Inquisitor multilirata (Smith E. A., 1877)
- Drillia multiplex Webster, 1906: synonym of Maoritomella multiplex (Webster, 1906)
- Drillia nagasakiensis E. A. Smith, 1879: synonym of Turridrupa nagasakiensis (E. A. Smith, 1879)
- Drillia nenia Hedley, 1903: synonym of Splendrillia nenia (Hedley, 1903)
- Drillia nicklesi Knudsen, 1956: synonym of Cerodrillia nicklesi (Knudsen, 1956)
- Drillia nigerrima (G. B. Sowerby I, 1834): synonym of Crassispira nigerrima (Sowerby I, 1834)
- Drillia nitens (Hinds, R.B., 1843): synonym of Agladrillia nitens (Hinds, 1843)
- Drillia nitens Brazier, J. 1876: synonym of Clavus cygneus (Melvill & Standen, 1897)
- Drillia nivosa E. A. Smith, 1904: synonym of Drillia caffra (E. A. Smith, 1882)
- Drillia nodifera Pease, 1860: synonym of Clavus nodifera (Pease, 1860)
- Drillia nodilirata (E. A. Smith, 1877): synonym of Pleurotoma nodilirata E. A. Smith, 1877
- †Drillia nodulosa (Lamarck, 1804): synonym of †Crassispira nodulosa (Lamarck, 1804)
- Drillia nodulosa Pease, 1863: synonym of Clavus nodulosa (Pease, 1863)
- Drillia obliquata (Reeve, L. A., 1845): synonym of Clavus obliquatus (Reeve, 1845)
- Drillia omia Barnard, 1958: synonym of Crassiclava omia (Barnard, 1958)
- Drillia oneili Barnard, 1958: synonym of Thelecytharella oneili (Barnard, 1958)
- Drillia opalus (Reeve, 1845): synonym of Plagiostropha opalus (Reeve, 1845)
- Drillia optabilis Murdoch & Suter, 1906: synonym of Awateria optabilis (R. Murdoch & Suter, 1906)
- Drillia ordinaria W. H. Turton, 1932: synonym of Inkinga platystoma (E. A. Smith, 1877)
- Drillia orellana (Dall, 1927): synonym of Clathrodrillia orellana Dall, 1927
- Drillia ostrearum Stearns, 1872: synonym of Pyrgospira ostrearum (Stearns, 1872)
- †Drillia oxyacrum (Cossmann, 1889): synonym of †Crassispira oxyacrum (Cossmann, 1889)
- Drillia pagodaeformis Schepman, 1913: synonym of Comitas pagodaeformis (Schepman, 1913)
- Drillia pagodula Dall, 1889: synonym of Fenimorea pagodula (Dall, 1889)
- Drillia papillosa Garrett, 1873: synonym of Carinapex papillosa (Garrett, 1873)
- Drillia parciplicata G. B. Sowerby III, 1915: synonym of Cymatosyrinx parciplicata (G. B. Sowerby III, 1915)
- Drillia paricostata E. A. Smith, 1879: synonym of Splendrillia raricostata (E. A. Smith, 1879)
- Drillia paroeca Melvill, 1923: synonym of Clavus paroeca (Melvill, 1923)
- Drillia parva E. A. Smith, 1888: synonym of Hemipleurotoma amymone W. H. Dall, 1918
- †Drillia passaloides Cossmann, 1902: synonym of †Crassispira passaloides (Cossmann, 1902)
- Drillia penicillata Carpenter, 1865: synonym of Pseudomelatoma penicillata (Carpenter, 1865)
- Drillia pentagonalis Verco, 1896: synonym of Bellaspira pentagonalis (Dall, 1889)
- Drillia pentagonalis Dall, 1889: synonym of Exomilus pentagonalis (Verco, 1896)
- Drillia peradmirabilis E. A. Smith, 1879: synonym of Asperdaphne peradmirabilis (E. A. Smith, 1879)
- Drillia perfluans Barnard, 1958: synonym of Antiguraleus perfluans (Barnard, 1958)
- Drillia persica (E. A. Smith, 1888): synonym of Splendrillia persica (E. A. Smith, 1888)
- Drillia petuchi Tippett, 1995: synonym of Clathrodrillia petuchi (Tippett, 1995)
- Drillia pharcida W. H. Dall, 1889: synonym of Inodrillia pharcida (W. H. Dall, 1889)
- †Drillia plateaui (Cossmann, 1889): synonym of †Crassispira plateaui (Cossmann, 1889)
- Drillia platystoma (E. A. Smith, 1877): synonym of Inkinga platystoma (E. A. Smith, 1877)
- Drillia pleonastica Barnard, 1958: synonym of Maoritomella pleonastica (Barnard, 1958)
- Drillia polytorta W. H. Dall, 1881: synonym of Hindsiclava polytorta (W. H. Dall, 1881)
- Drillia ponciana Dall & Simpson, 1901: synonym of Crassispira nigrescens (C. B. Adams, 1845)
- Drillia praeclara G. B. Sowerby III, 1915: synonym of Splendrillia praeclara (Melvill, 1893)
- Drillia praetermissa E. A. Smith, 1904: synonym of Naudedrillia praetermissa (E. A. Smith, 1904)
- Drillia prosuavis C. Hedley, 1903: synonym of Vexitomina suavis (E. A. Smith, 1888)
- Drillia primula Melvill, 1923: synonym of Buchema primula (Melvill, 1923)
- Drillia prunulum Melvill, J.C. & R. Standen, 1901: synonym of Paradrillia inconstans prunulum (Melvill, J.C. & R. Standen, 1901)
- Drillia punctatostriata Carpenter, 1856: synonym of Maesiella punctatostriata (Carpenter, 1856)
- Drillia pusilla Garrett, 1873: synonym of Clavus pusilla (Garrett, 1873)
- †Drillia quoniamensis (Boussac in Périer, 1941): synonym of †Crassispira quoniamensis (Boussac in Périer, 1941)
- Drillia quoyi (Desmoulins, 1842): synonym of Epidirona quoyi (Desmoulins, 1842)
- Drillia radula (Hinds, 1843): synonym of Inquisitor radula (Hinds, 1843)
- Drillia raricostata E. A. Smith, 1879: synonym of Splendrillia raricostata (E. A. Smith, 1879)
- Drillia raricostulata (Deshayes, 1865): synonym of Crassispira raricostulata (Deshayes, 1865)
- Drillia reciproca Gould, 1860: synonym of Tomopleura reciproca (Gould, 1860)
- Drillia regia (Reeve, 1842): synonym of Vexitomina regia (Reeve, 1842)
- Drillia renaudi Arnold, 1903: synonym of Rhodopetoma renaudi (Arnold, 1903)
- Drillia resplendens (Melvill, J.C., 1898): synonym of Splendrillia resplendens (Melvill, J.C., 1898)
- Drillia rhodochroa Dautzenberg, 1900: synonym of Agladrillia rhodochroa (Dautzenberg, 1900)
- Drillia rioensis E. A. Smith, 1915: synonym of Brachytoma rioensis (E. A. Smith, 1915)
- Drillia rosea (G. B. Sowerby I, 1834): synonym of Drillia roseola (Hertlein, L.G. & A.M. Strong, 1955)
- Drillia roseobasis Pilsbry, H. A. & E. G. Vanatta, 1902: synonym of Drillia albicostata (Sowerby I, 1834)
- Drillia roseotincta W. H. Dall, 1918: synonym of Drillia albicostata (G. B. I Sowerby, 1834)
- Drillia rougeyroni (Souverbie in Souverbie & Montrouzier, 1874): synonym of Drillia barkliensis H. Adams, 1869
- Drillia rousi (G. B. Sowerby III, 1886): synonym of Nquma rousi (Sowerby III, 1886)
- Drillia rubidofusca Schepman, 1913: synonym of Crassispira rubidofusca (Schepman, 1913)
- Drillia rudis (G. B. Sowerby I, 1834): synonym of Crassispira rudis (Sowerby I, 1834)
- Drillia rufolineata Schepman, 1913: synonym of Brachytoma rufolineata (Schepman, 1913)
- Drillia sacra (Reeve, L. A., 1845): synonym of Clavus sacra (Reeve, L. A., 1845)
- Drillia salvadorica (Hertlein & Strong, 1951): synonym of Clathrodrillia salvadorica (Hertlein & Strong, 1951)
- Drillia saulcydianum (Récluz, C., 1851): synonym of Drillia umbilicata Gray, 1838
- Drillia saxea G. B. Sowerby III, 1896: synonym of Austrodrillia saxea (G. B. Sowerby III, 1896)
- Drillia schoutanica May, 1911: synonym of Epidirona schoutanica (May, 1911)
- Drillia scitecosta (G. B. Sowerby III, 1903): synonym of Tropidoturris scitecosta (Sowerby III, 1903)
- Drillia scitecostata [sic]: synonym of Tropidoturris scitecosta (Sowerby III, 1903)
- †Drillia sedilia Dall, 1890: synonym of †Sedilia sedilia (Dall, 1890)
- Drillia sexradiata Odhner, 1917: synonym of Inquisitor sexradiata (Odhner, 1917)
- Drillia simplex Turton W. H., 1932: synonym of Anacithara simplex (Turton W. H., 1932)
- Drillia simplicicingula Barnard, 1958: synonym of Tropidoturris simplicicingula (Barnard, 1958)
- Drillia sinclairi Gillies, 1882: synonym of Neoguraleus sinclairi (Gillies, 1882)
- Drillia sinensis (Hinds, 1843): synonym of Crassispira sinensis (Hinds, 1843)
- Drillia sinensis Brazier, 1876: synonym of Inquisitor sterrha (Watson, 1881)
- Drillia smirna (Dall, 1881): synonym of Globidrillia smirna (Dall, 1881)
- Drillia solicitata G. B. Sowerby III, 1913: synonym of Splendrillia solicitata (G. B. Sowerby III, 1913)
- Drillia solida (C. B. Adams, 1850): synonym of Clathrodrillia solida (C. B. Adams, 1850)
- Drillia sowerbyi Reeve, L. A., 1846: synonym of Crassispira turricula (G. B. Sowerby I, 1834)
- Drillia spadix (Watson, 1886): synonym of Paracuneus spadix (Watson, 1886)
- Drillia spaldingi J. W. Brazier, 1876: synonym of Inquisitor spicata (R. B. Hinds, 1843)
- Drillia spectrum (Reeve, 1845): synonym of Funa spectrum (Reeve, 1845)
- Drillia sterrha (Watson, 1881): synonym of Inquisitor sterrha (Watson, 1881)
- Drillia streptonotus Pilsbry, 1904: synonym of Etrema streptonotus (Pilsbry, 1904)
- †Drillia streptophora (Bayan, 1873): synonym of †Crassispira streptophora (Bayan, 1873)
- Drillia striata Hinds, 1844: synonym of Conopleura striata (Hinds, 1844)
- Drillia strigata G. B. Sowerby II, 1874: synonym of Drillia barkliensis H. Adams, 1869
- Drillia suavis Hervier, 1896: synonym of Ceritoturris suavis (Hervier, 1896)
- Drillia subangusta Schepman, 1913: synonym of Inquisitor subangusta (Schepman, 1913)
- Drillia subauriformis E. A. Smith, 1879: synonym of Etrema subauriformis (E. A. Smith, 1879)
- Drillia subcontracta E. A. Smith, 1904: synonym of Clionella subcontracta (E. A. Smith, 1904)
- †Drillia (Tripia) subgranulosa (d'Orbigny, 1850): synonym of †Crassispira subgranulosa (d'Orbigny, 1850)
- Drillia subobliquata E. A. Smith, 1879: synonym of Clavus subobliquatus (E. A. Smith, 1879)
- Drillia subplicata Verco, 1909: synonym of Austrodrillia subplicata (Verco, 1909)
- Drillia subsida W. H. Dall, 1881: synonym of Mangelia subsida (W. H. Dall, 1881)
- †Drillia subturrella (de Boury, 1899): synonym of †Drilliola subturrella (de Boury, 1899)
- Drillia subviridis May, 1911: synonym of Splendrillia subviridis (May, 1911)
- †Drillia sulcata (Lamarck, 1804): synonym of †Crassispira sulcata (Lamarck, 1804)
- Drillia suluensis Schepman, 1913: synonym of Splendrillia suluensis (Schepman, 1913)
- Drillia suturalis Gray, 1838: synonym of Ptychobela suturalis (Gray, 1838)
- Drillia taeniata J. E. Tenison-Woods, 1878: synonym of Austrodrillia beraudiana (J. C. H. Crosse, 1863)
- Drillia tasconium Melvill & Standen, 1901: synonym of Crassispira tasconium (Melvill & Standen, 1901)
- Drillia tayloriana (Reeve, 1846): synonym of Funa tayloriana (Reeve, 1846)
- Drillia telescopialis Verco, 1896: synonym of Exomilus telescopialis (Verco, 1896)
- †Drillia tenuicrenata (Cossmann, 1902): synonym of †Crassispira tenuicrenata (Cossmann, 1902)
- † Drillia tenuispiralis P. Marshall, 1918: synonym of †Austroclavus tenuispiralis (P. Marshall, 1918)
- Drillia testudinis H. A. Pilsbry & E. G. Vanatta, 1923: synonym of Drillia albicostata (G. B. I Sowerby, 1834)
- Drillia thea Dall, 1884: synonym of Cerodrillia thea (Dall, 1884)
- Drillia themeropis Melvill & Standen, 1896: synonym of Anacithara themeropis (Melvill & Standen, 1896)
- Drillia theoreta (Melvill, 1899): synonym of Funa theoreta (Melvill, 1899)
- Drillia thetis E. A. Smith, 1904: synonym of Striatoguraleus thetis (E. A. Smith, 1904)
- Drillia timorensis Schepman, 1913: synonym of Thelecytharella timorensis (Schepman, 1913)
- Drillia tokyoensis Pilsbry, 1895: synonym of Philbertia tokyoensis (Pilsbry, 1895)
- Drillia topaza J. C. Melvill & R. Standen, 1901: synonym of Funa tayloriana (L. A. Reeve, 1846)
- Drillia torosa Carpenter, 1864: synonym of Pseudomelatoma torosa (Carpenter, 1864)
- Drillia torresiana E. A. Smith, 1884: synonym of Inquisitor sterrha (Watson, 1881)
- †Drillia (Crassispira) toulai Cossmann, 1913: synonym of †Crassipira toulai (Cossmann, 1913)
- Drillia trailli Pritchard, G.B. & Gatliff, J.H. 1906: synonym of Vexitomina coxi (Angas, 1867)
- Drillia tricarinata Tenison-Woods, 1878: synonym of Filodrillia tricarinata (Tenison-Woods, 1878)
- Drillia tristicha Dall, 1889: synonym of Compsodrillia tristicha (Dall, 1889)
- Drillia trophonoides Verco, 1909: synonym of Filodrillia trophonoides (Verco, 1909)
- Drillia tryoni Dall, 1889: synonym of Clathrodrillia tryoni (Dall, 1889)
- Drillia tuberosa E. A. Smith, 1875: synonym of Brachytoma tuberosa (E. A. Smith, 1875)
- Drillia turtoni E. A. Smith, 1890: synonym of Glyphostoma turtoni (E. A. Smith, 1890)
- Drillia unifasciata (Smith, 1888): synonym of Drillia enna (Dall, 1918)
- Drillia unizonalis (Lamarck, 1822): synonym of Clavus unizonalis (Lamarck, 1822)
- Drillia ustickei B. Hayes, 1959: synonym of Neodrillia cydia (P. Bartsch, 1943)
- Drillia variabilis (Smith E. A., 1877): synonym of Inquisitor variabilis (Smith E. A., 1877)
- †Drillia vasseuri Cossmann, 1896: synonym of †Crassispira vasseuri (Cossmann, 1896)
- Drillia vidualoides Garrett, 1873: synonym of Clavus unizonalis (Lamarck, 1822)
- Drillia walcotae Sowerby III, 1893: synonym of Asperdaphne walcotae Sowerby III, 1893
- Drillia weldiana Tenison-Woods, 1877: synonym of Fenimorea fucata (Reeve, 1845)
- Drillia wolfei Tippett, 1995: synonym of Clathrodrillia wolfei (Tippett, 1995)
- Drillia woodsi Beddome, 1883: synonym of Splendrillia woodsi (Beddome, 1883)
- Drillia xanthoporphyria Melvill & Standen, 1896: synonym of Anacithara themeropis (Melvill & Standen, 1896)
- Drillia zenobia Turton, W.H., 1932: synonym of Naudedrillia praetermissa (E. A. Smith, 1904)
