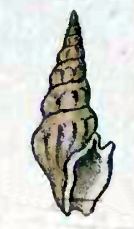
- Drawing of a shell of Drillia aquatilis

Scientific classification
- Kingdom: Animalia
- Phylum: Mollusca
- Class: Gastropoda
- Subclass: Caenogastropoda
- Order: Neogastropoda
- Superfamily: Conoidea
- Family: Drilliidae
- Genus: Drillia
- Species: D. aquatilis

Binomial name
- Drillia aquatilis (Reeve, L.A., 1845)

Synonyms
- Pleurotoma (Drillia) aquatilis Reeve L.A., 1845

= Drillia aquatilis =

Species of gastropod

Drillia aquatilis is a species of sea snail, a marine gastropod mollusk in the family Drilliidae.

== Description ==
The solid shell is ovately turreted with an acuminated spire. The whorls are smooth, depressed round the upper part, obliquely plicately tubercled. The siphonal canal is very short. The anal sinus is large. The color of the shell is ivory-white, painted with bands of extremely fine pale horny brown waved lines.
