= Drillia annielonae =

Scientific classification
- Kingdom: Animalia
- Phylum: Mollusca
- Class: Gastropoda
- Subclass: Caenogastropoda
- Order: Neogastropoda
- Superfamily: Conoidea
- Family: Drilliidae
- Genus: Drillia
- Species: D. annielonae

Binomial name
- Drillia annielonae Nolf & Verstraeten, 2007

Species of sea snail

Drillia annielonae is a species of sea snail, a marine gastropod mollusc in the family Drilliidae.

== Distribution ==
This marine species occurs off West Africa.
