= Drillia griffithii =

Scientific classification
- Kingdom: Animalia
- Phylum: Mollusca
- Class: Gastropoda
- Subclass: Caenogastropoda
- Order: Neogastropoda
- Superfamily: Conoidea
- Family: Drilliidae
- Genus: Drillia
- Species: D. griffithii

Binomial name
- Drillia griffithii (Reeve, 1843)

Synonyms
- Clavatula griffithii Gray, 1834; Pleurotoma griffithii Reeve, 1843

Species of gastropod

Drillia griffithii is a species of sea snail, a marine gastropod mollusk in the family Drilliidae.

== Distribution ==
This species occurs in the Indian Ocean off Madagascar.
