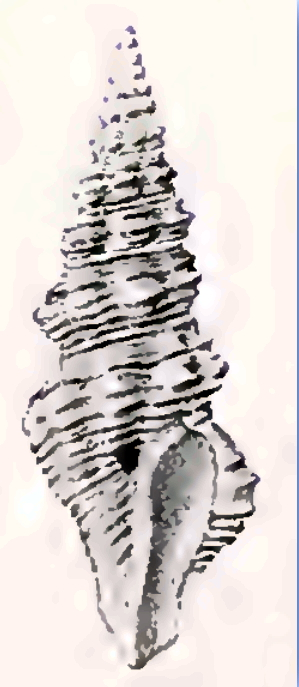
- Original image of a shell of Drillia euchroes

Scientific classification
- Kingdom: Animalia
- Phylum: Mollusca
- Class: Gastropoda
- Subclass: Caenogastropoda
- Order: Neogastropoda
- Superfamily: Conoidea
- Family: Drilliidae
- Genus: Drillia
- Species: D. euchroes

Binomial name
- Drillia euchroes Melvill, J.C., 1912

Synonyms
- Drillia euchroës Mevill J.C., 1912

= Drillia euchroes =

Species of gastropod

Drillia euchroes is a species of sea snail, a marine gastropod mollusc in the family Drilliidae.

== Description ==
The length of the shell attains 16 mm, its diameter 4.5 mm.

A. brightly coloured species, in shape attenuate-fusiform. The shell contains 11 whorls, with a small, vitreous, bulbous protoconch. The remainder is suturally considerably impressed. The shell is straw-coloured with closely ranged spiral lirae of dark chestnut alternating with ochreous. In the centre of each whorl is a white spiral band, bringing into prominence the strongly modiiled ribs of the angle of the whorl. The aperture is oblong. The outer lip is thin.

== Distribution ==
This marine species occurs in the Persian Gulf.
