= Drillia siebenrocki =

Scientific classification
- Kingdom: Animalia
- Phylum: Mollusca
- Class: Gastropoda
- Subclass: Caenogastropoda
- Order: Neogastropoda
- Superfamily: Conoidea
- Family: Drilliidae
- Genus: Drillia
- Species: D. siebenrocki

Binomial name
- Drillia siebenrocki (Sturany, 1900)

Synonyms
- Clavus siebenrocki (Sturany, 1903); Pleurotoma (Clavus) siebenrocki Sturany, 1900 superseded combination; Pleurotoma siebenrocki Sturany, 1900 superseded combination

Species of gastropod

Drillia siebenrocki is a species of sea snail, a marine gastropod mollusk in the family Drilliidae.

== Description ==
The height of the shell measures 36.7 mm, and the width [measures] 14.0 mm; the aperture is 16.0 mm high and 5.5 mm wide.

(Original description in German) The shell is turreted, incised (or grooved), and light yellowish-brown. It is built up from 12 whorls, which, with the exception of the protoconch, are equipped with 7 to 8 knob-like ribs. In the deeply constricted upper part of the whorls, fine spiral lines run, while in the rest of the whorl, there are coarser ribs, which are sometimes irregularly kinked or undulating. The numerous, fine growth lines are usually only visible in the concave parts. The aperture has a deep, tongue-shaped notch at the top and a very short, recurved siphonal canal at the bottom.

== Distribution ==
This species occurs in the Red Sea
