= Drillia fraga =

Scientific classification
- Kingdom: Animalia
- Phylum: Mollusca
- Class: Gastropoda
- Subclass: Caenogastropoda
- Order: Neogastropoda
- Superfamily: Conoidea
- Family: Drilliidae
- Genus: Drillia
- Species: D. fraga

Binomial name
- Drillia fraga H.B. Preston, 1908

Species of gastropod

Drillia fraga is a species of sea snail, a marine gastropod mollusk in the family Drilliidae.

== Description ==
The length of the shell attains 22 mm, its diameter 8 mm.

(Original description) The shell has an elongated fusiform shape. It is deep reddish brown. It contains 7 whorls, rather flat, sculptured with regular closely set rows of small white tubercles and bearing a single, infra-sutural row of coarser tubercles between which and the remaining smaller rows there is a broad but shallow groove. The sutures are impressed. The aperture is obliquely ovate. The siphonal canal is short.

== Distribution ==
This marine species occurs off the Andaman Islands
