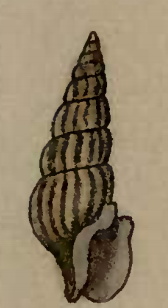
- Drawing of Drillia albicostata

Scientific classification
- Kingdom: Animalia
- Phylum: Mollusca
- Class: Gastropoda
- Subclass: Caenogastropoda
- Order: Neogastropoda
- Superfamily: Conoidea
- Family: Drilliidae
- Genus: Drillia
- Species: D. albicostata

Binomial name
- Drillia albicostata (Sowerby I, 1834)

Synonyms
- Drillia roseobasis Pilsbry, H.A. & E.G. Vanatta, 1902 (preoccupied name); Drillia roseotincta W.H. Dall, 1918; Drillia testudinis H.A. Pilsbry & E.G. Vanatta, 1923; Pleurotoma albicostata Sowerby I, 1834; Pleurotoma (Ishnula) roseotincta Dall, W.H., 1918; Pleurotoma testudinis Pilsbry, H.A. & E.G. Vanatta, 1923; Pleurotoma zeteki Dall & Ochsner, 1928

= Drillia albicostata =

Species of gastropod

Drillia albicostata is a species of sea snail, a marine gastropod mollusk in the family Drilliidae.

== Description ==
The shell grows to a length of 22 mm. The shell is rose-colored, the longitudinal ribs are white, close-set. There is no spiral sculpture. The aperture is callous above. The anal sinus is rather deep.

== Distribution ==
This species occurs in the demersal zone of the Pacific Ocean off the Galapagos Islands.
