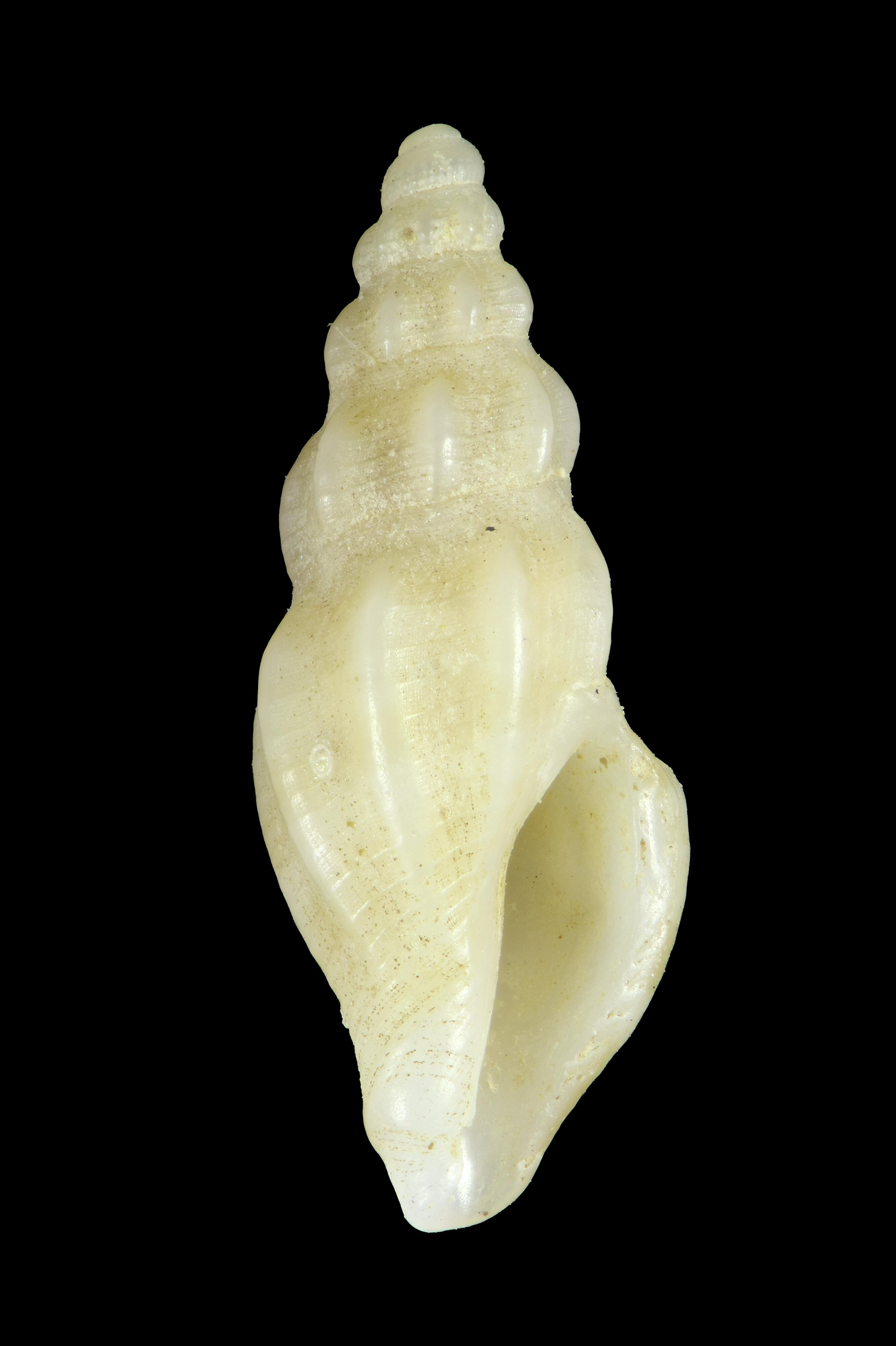
- Syntype of Drillia omanensis in the collection of Amgueddfa Cymru – Museum Wales

Scientific classification
- Kingdom: Animalia
- Phylum: Mollusca
- Class: Gastropoda
- Subclass: Caenogastropoda
- Order: Neogastropoda
- Superfamily: Conoidea
- Family: Drilliidae
- Genus: Drillia
- Species: D. omanensis

Binomial name
- Drillia omanensis Melvill, J.C. & R. Standen, 1901

= Drillia omanensis =

Species of gastropod

Drillia omanensis is a species of sea snail, a marine gastropod mollusk in the family Drilliidae.

== Description ==
The length of the shell attains 14 mm, its diameter 4.5 mm.

The shell is white, pale flesh-colour, or tinged with brown, the ribs themselves usually being white. The shell has a very elegant fusiform contour. It contains 9 whorls. Two or three whorls are apical, colourless, and crystalline, or else brown-tinged. The remainder are thickly ribbed. The chief characteristic of the species is the very fine, conspicuous, and delicate spiral liration, these lirae imparting a sericeous appearance to the whole surface. The white aperture is oblong. The outer lip is curved, slightly effuse. The straight columella is white and shining. The siphonal canal is slightly elongated.

== Distribution ==
This marine species occurs in the Gulf of Oman.
