= Drillia diasi =

Scientific classification
- Kingdom: Animalia
- Phylum: Mollusca
- Class: Gastropoda
- Subclass: Caenogastropoda
- Order: Neogastropoda
- Superfamily: Conoidea
- Family: Drilliidae
- Genus: Drillia
- Species: D. diasi

Binomial name
- Drillia diasi K.H. Barnard, 1958

Species of sea snail

Drillia diasi is a species of sea snail, a marine gastropod mollusk in the family Drilliidae.

== Description ==
The creamy white shell consists of calcium carbonates and unusually for shelled animals contains little to no chitin. It attains the length 9 mm and the diameter 3.75 mm. This animal is carnivorous, has only one gill and one kidney and lacks a brain.

Drillia diasi was first described scientifically in 1958 by Keppel Harcourt Barnard (1887–1964), a South African zoologist who spent his career at the South African Museum in Cape Town. Barnard's description appeared in his monograph on South African marine gastropods of the suborder Toxoglossa, published in the Annals of the South African Museum.

== Distribution ==
This marine species occurs in the demersal zone of the Atlantic Ocean off South Africa.

== Life cycle ==
This species is a non-broadcast spawner. Its life cycle does not include the trochophore stage.
