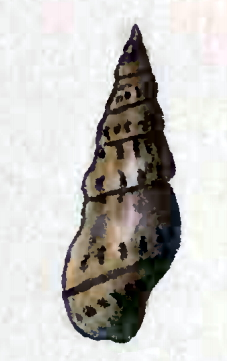
- Drawing of a shell of Drillia corusca

Scientific classification
- Kingdom: Animalia
- Phylum: Mollusca
- Class: Gastropoda
- Subclass: Caenogastropoda
- Order: Neogastropoda
- Superfamily: Conoidea
- Family: Drilliidae
- Genus: Drillia
- Species: D. corusca

Binomial name
- Drillia corusca (Reeve, 1843)

Synonyms
- Drillia corrusca Böttger, O., 1895; Turris (Drillia) corusca Reeve, 1843

= Drillia corusca =

Species of gastropod

Drillia corusca is a species of sea snail, a marine gastropod mollusk in the family Drilliidae.

== Description ==
The shell has a rather pyramidal shape. It is highly polished. The upper portion of the whorls are flat, clouded with reddish brown and white. The lower portion are more prominent, encircled with a row of irregular reddish brown dots. The body whorl is encircled with two rows of dots. The aperture is short. The siphonal canal is very short.

The shell differs much from the ordinary type of Drillia, the form being more like a Daphnella.

== Distribution ==
This marine species occurs off the Philippines.
