= Drillia inchoata =

Scientific classification
- Kingdom: Animalia
- Phylum: Mollusca
- Class: Gastropoda
- Subclass: Caenogastropoda
- Order: Neogastropoda
- Superfamily: Conoidea
- Family: Drilliidae
- Genus: Drillia
- Species: D. inchoata

Binomial name
- Drillia inchoata (Sturany, 1900)

Synonyms
- Clavus inchoatus (Sturany, 1903); Pleurotoma (Drillia) inchoata Sturany, 1900 superseded combination; Pleurotoma inchoata Sturany, 1900 (original combination)

Species of gastropod

Drillia inchoata is a species of sea snail, a marine gastropod mollusk in the family Drilliidae.

== Description ==
The height of the shell is 21.3 mm, and the width is 9.0 mm; the height of the aperture is 9.1 mm.

(Original description in German) The shell is truncated and spindle-shaped, with a light yellow color. It consists of 9 1/2 whorls, each of which, except for the protoconch, is concave in its upper half and convex in its lower half. The shell is equipped with numerous spiral ridges and approximately 15 to 16 wavy transverse ribs. Additionally, there are microscopically fine growth lines between the transverse ribs. Immediately before the (unfortunately poorly preserved) aperture, there is a knobby swollen transverse rib that is projected to the right.

== Distribution ==
This species occurs in the Red Sea.
