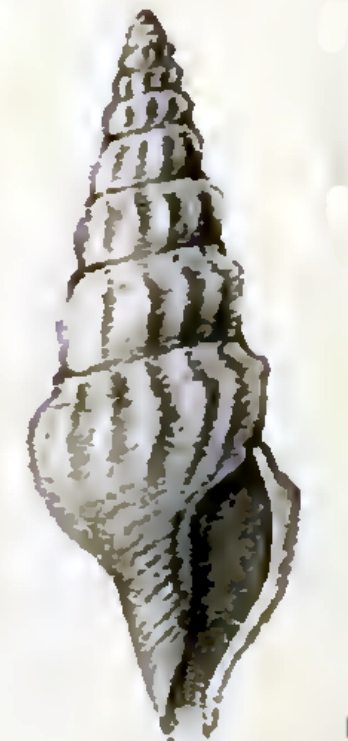
- Original image of a shell of Drillia athyrma

Scientific classification
- Kingdom: Animalia
- Phylum: Mollusca
- Class: Gastropoda
- Subclass: Caenogastropoda
- Order: Neogastropoda
- Superfamily: Conoidea
- Family: Drilliidae
- Genus: Drillia
- Species: D. athyrma

Binomial name
- Drillia athyrma Melvill, J.C. & Standen, R., 1901

= Drillia athyrma =

Species of gastropod

Drillia athyrma is a species of sea snail, a marine gastropod mollusc in the family Drilliidae.

== Description ==
The length of the shell attains 13 mm, its diameter 4.5 mm.

The buff-colored shell is turriculated, with an elevated spire with 10 whorls. The oblique, acute, longitudinal ribs and the incrassate, subventricose, upper whorls seem characteristic. The body whorl contains about 12 ribs. The aperture is oval. The white columella is smooth. The siphonal canal is very short.

== Distribution ==
This species occurs in the demersal zone of the Gulf of Oman
