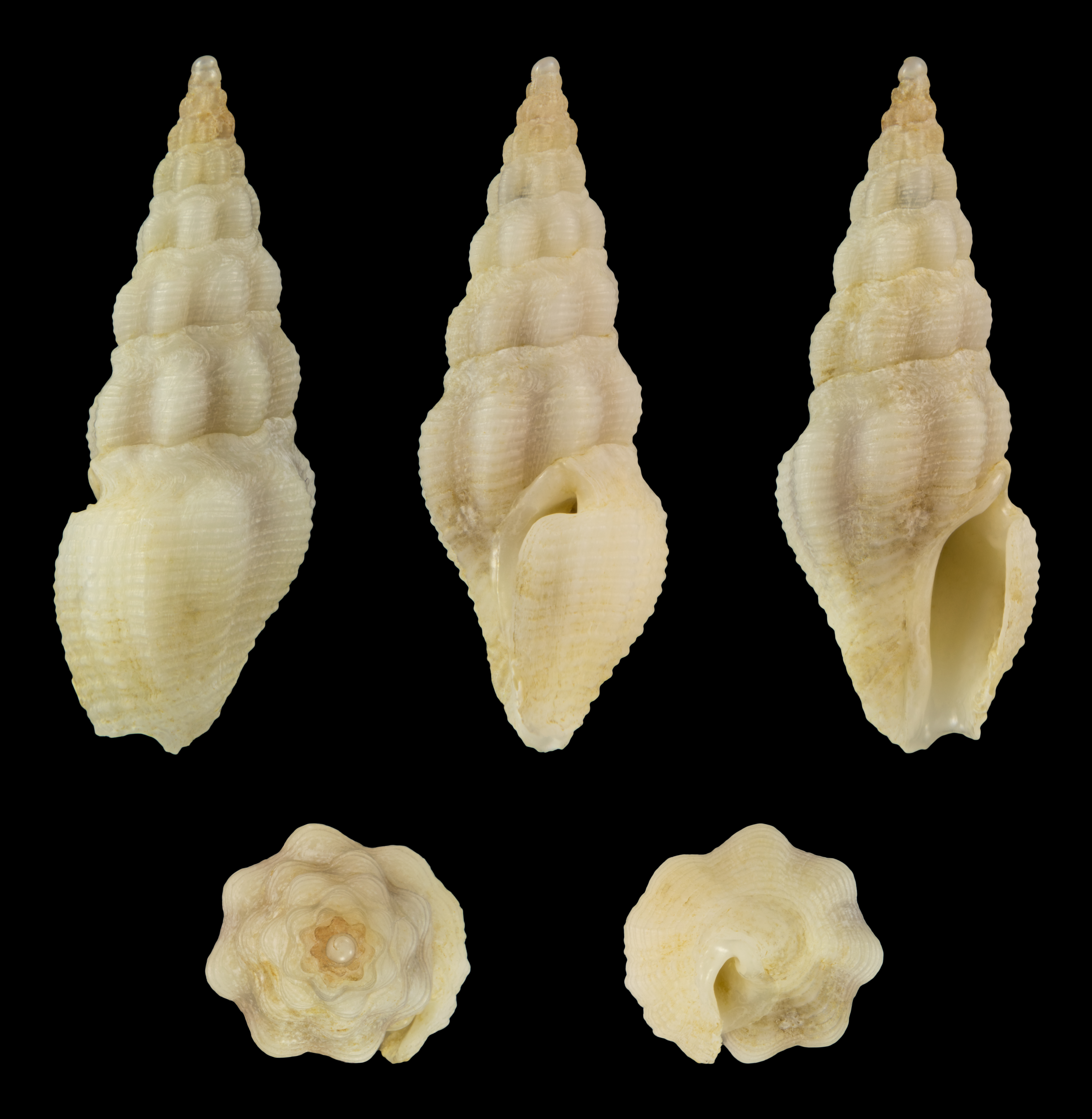

Scientific classification
- Kingdom: Animalia
- Phylum: Mollusca
- Class: Gastropoda
- Subclass: Caenogastropoda
- Order: Neogastropoda
- Superfamily: Conoidea
- Family: Drilliidae
- Genus: Drillia
- Species: D. angolensis

Binomial name
- Drillia angolensis Odhner, 1923

= Drillia angolensis =

Species of gastropod

Drillia angolensis is a species of sea snail, a marine gastropod mollusk in the family Drilliidae.
