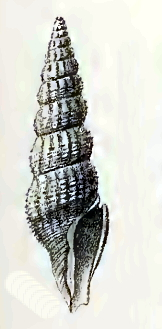
- Original image of a shell of Drillia philotima

Scientific classification
- Kingdom: Animalia
- Phylum: Mollusca
- Class: Gastropoda
- Subclass: Caenogastropoda
- Order: Neogastropoda
- Superfamily: Conoidea
- Family: Drilliidae
- Genus: Drillia
- Species: D. philotima

Binomial name
- Drillia philotima Melvill, J.C. & R. Standen, 1903

= Drillia philotima =

Species of gastropod

Drillia philotima is a species of sea snail, a marine gastropod mollusk in the family Drilliidae.

== Description ==
The size of an adult shell attains 30 mm, its diameter 8 mm.

The attenuated, grayish-white shell has a fusiform shape. It contains 11 whorls, of which two in the protoconch. These two apical whorls are vitreous and dark. The other whorls are convex and crossed by oblique, symmetrically arranged ribs. There are only few in the upper whorls, but numerous (up to fifteen) and of a brown color in the penultimate whorl and in the body whorl They are crossed by transverse nodulose lirations. There is no beading at the sutures. The body whorl shows a dorsal varix close to the outer lip. The long, narrow aperture is white on the interior. The outer lip is slightly effuse and distinctly sinuous. The siphonal canal is wide and short. The columella is straight.

== Distribution ==
This species occurs in the Red Sea and in the Persian Gulf.
