= Drillia rufescens =

Scientific classification
- Kingdom: Animalia
- Phylum: Mollusca
- Class: Gastropoda
- Subclass: Caenogastropoda
- Order: Neogastropoda
- Superfamily: Conoidea
- Family: Drilliidae
- Genus: Drillia
- Species: D. rufescens

Binomial name
- Drillia rufescens Dunker R.W., 1871

Species of gastropod

Drillia rufescens is a species of sea snail, a marine gastropod mollusk in the family Drilliidae.

== Description ==
The length of the shell attains 8 mm, its diameter 3.5 mm.

(Original description in Latin) The shell is pyramidal, thin, shiny, translucent, and reddish. It features seven rounded whorls that are angled at the suture, and is equipped with longitudinal folds and transverse grooves. The body whorl extends a little longer than the spire. The aperture is oval, and the siphonal canal is short and wide. The lip is grooved on the inside, and the suture is deep.

== Distribution ==
This species occurs in the Pacific Ocean off Samoa.
