= Drillia dovyalis =

Scientific classification
- Kingdom: Animalia
- Phylum: Mollusca
- Class: Gastropoda
- Subclass: Caenogastropoda
- Order: Neogastropoda
- Superfamily: Conoidea
- Family: Drilliidae
- Genus: Drillia
- Species: D. dovyalis

Binomial name
- Drillia dovyalis K.H. Barnard, 1969

Species of gastropod

Drillia dovyalis is a species of sea snail, a marine gastropod mollusc in the family Drilliidae.

== Distribution ==
This species occurs in the demersal zone of the Southeast Atlantic Ocean off South Africa.
