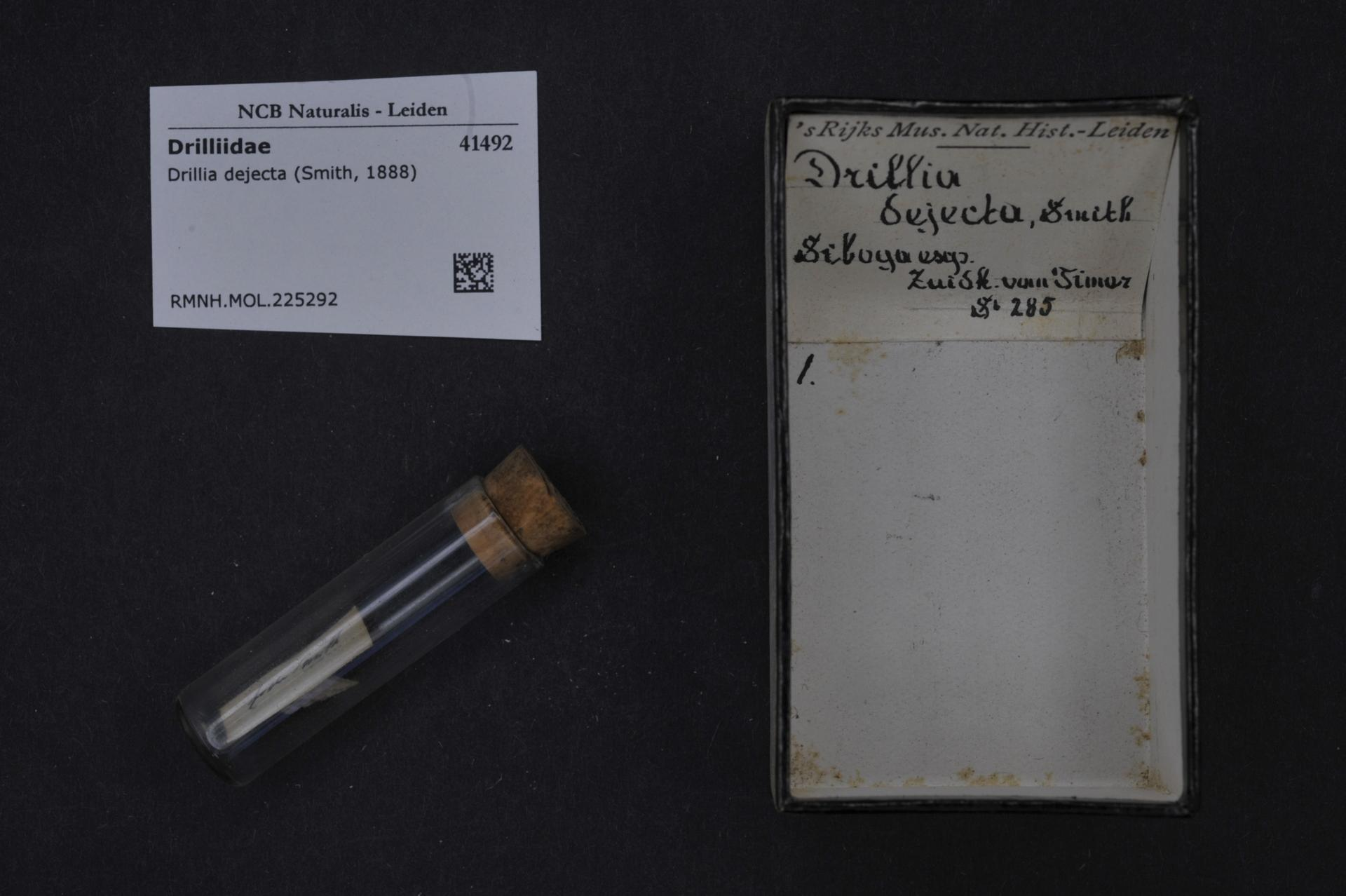
- Drillia dejecta, specimen at Naturalis Biodiversity Center

Scientific classification
- Kingdom: Animalia
- Phylum: Mollusca
- Class: Gastropoda
- Subclass: Caenogastropoda
- Order: Neogastropoda
- Superfamily: Conoidea
- Family: Drilliidae
- Genus: Drillia
- Species: D. dejecta

Binomial name
- Drillia dejecta (E.A. Smith, 1888)

Synonyms
- Pleurotoma (Drillia) dejecta E.A. Smith, 1888

= Drillia dejecta =

Species of gastropod

Drillia dejecta is a species of sea snail, a marine gastropod mollusc in the family Drilliidae.

== Description ==
The shell grows to a length of 11.5 mm; its diameter 3.5 mm. The fusiform shell contains nine whorls, of which two dull, shining whorls in the protoconch. The other whorls are convex with oblique, acute, longitudinal ribs (11 in the body whorl). Three spiral lirae form nodules when crossing the ribs. The body whorl contains about 15 spiral lirae, but only the upper three are nodulose. The ribs on the body whorl are terminated inferiorly by the spiral lirations around the cauda, which are rather thicker than those on the rest of the shell. The oval aperture measures 10/23 of the total length of the shell. The short siphonal canal is recurved and inclined to the right. The anal sinus is large and deep. The columella is slightly angled and shows a callus.

== Distribution ==
This marine species occurs off the Philippines.
