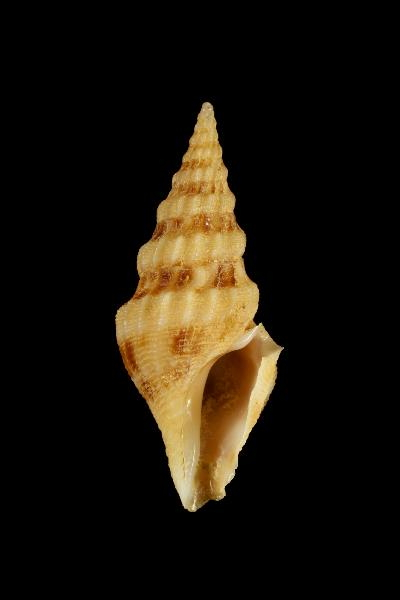
- Apertural view of a shell of Drillia poecila (specimen at MNHN, Paris)

Scientific classification
- Kingdom: Animalia
- Phylum: Mollusca
- Class: Gastropoda
- Subclass: Caenogastropoda
- Order: Neogastropoda
- Superfamily: Conoidea
- Family: Drilliidae
- Genus: Drillia
- Species: D. poecila

Binomial name
- Drillia poecila Sysoev & Bouchet, 2001

= Drillia poecila =

Species of gastropod

Drillia poecila is a species of sea snail, a marine gastropod mollusk in the family Drilliidae.

== Description ==
The size of an adult shell varies between 29 mm and 50 mm.

== Distribution ==
This species occurs in the demersal zone of the Western Central Pacific Ocean off the Philippines and New Caledonia at a depth of 250 m.
