= Drillia armilla =

Scientific classification
- Kingdom: Animalia
- Phylum: Mollusca
- Class: Gastropoda
- Subclass: Caenogastropoda
- Order: Neogastropoda
- Superfamily: Conoidea
- Family: Drilliidae
- Genus: Drillia
- Species: D. armilla

Binomial name
- Drillia armilla Barnard, 1958

Species of gastropod

Drillia armilla is a species of sea snail, a marine gastropod mollusk in the family Drilliidae.

== Description ==
The length of the shell attains 7.5 mm, its diameter is 3.5 mm.

== Distribution ==
This species occurs in the demersal zone off East London, South Africa at depths between 145 m and 236 m.
