= Drillia sowerbyi =

Scientific classification
- Kingdom: Animalia
- Phylum: Mollusca
- Class: Gastropoda
- Subclass: Caenogastropoda
- Order: Neogastropoda
- Superfamily: Conoidea
- Family: Drilliidae
- Genus: Drillia
- Species: D. sowerbyi

Binomial name
- Drillia sowerbyi Turton, W.H., 1932

Species of gastropod

Drillia sowerbyi is a species of sea snail, a marine gastropod mollusk in the family Drilliidae.

== Description ==
The length of the shell attains 11 mm, its diameter is 4.5 mm.

== Distribution ==
This marine species occurs off KwaZulu-Natal, South Africa.
