= Drillia indra =

Scientific classification
- Kingdom: Animalia
- Phylum: Mollusca
- Class: Gastropoda
- Subclass: Caenogastropoda
- Order: Neogastropoda
- Superfamily: Conoidea
- Family: Drilliidae
- Genus: Drillia
- Species: D. indra

Binomial name
- Drillia indra Thiele, 1925

Species of gastropod

Drillia indra is a species of sea snail, a marine gastropod mollusk in the family Drilliidae.

== Distribution ==
This species occurs in the demersal zone in the Zanzibar Channel.
