= Drillia albomaculata =

Scientific classification
- Kingdom: Animalia
- Phylum: Mollusca
- Class: Gastropoda
- Subclass: Caenogastropoda
- Order: Neogastropoda
- Superfamily: Conoidea
- Family: Drilliidae
- Genus: Drillia
- Species: D. albomaculata

Binomial name
- Drillia albomaculata (Adams C. B., 1845)

Synonyms
- Pleurotoma albomaculata Adams C. B., 1845

Species of gastropod

Drillia albomaculata is a species of sea snail, a marine gastropod mollusk in the family Drilliidae.

The database Gastropods.com states that this species is a synonym of Pilsbryspira zebroides (Weinkauff, H.C., 1884)

== Distribution ==
This species occurs in the demersal zone of the Caribbean Sea, off Jamaica.
