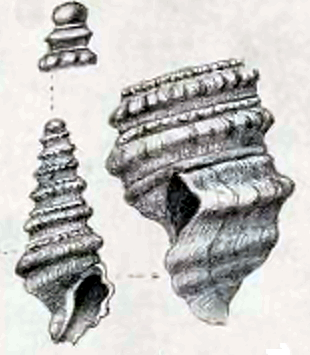
- Original image of a shell, the protoconch and the aperture of Drillia suxdorfi

Scientific classification
- Kingdom: Animalia
- Phylum: Mollusca
- Class: Gastropoda
- Subclass: Caenogastropoda
- Order: Neogastropoda
- Superfamily: Conoidea
- Family: Drilliidae
- Genus: Drillia
- Species: D. suxdorfi

Binomial name
- Drillia suxdorfi Strebel, 1905

= Drillia suxdorfi =

Species of gastropod

Drillia suxdorfi is a species of sea snail, a marine gastropod mollusk in the family Drilliidae.

== Description ==
The length of the shell varies between 8 mm and 12 mm.

(Original description in German) The shell is somewhat broader in layout. Since the apex is broken off in all of the large specimens, the author can only estimate the number of whorls at about 9. The body whorl is comparatively lower and is more strongly constricted below. The protoconch sits upon the succeeding whorls in a more button-like manner. In the aperture section, the broad siphonal canal is more oblique, and the basal angulation is more clearly prominent.

The sculpture begins after only 1½ whorls, first with a sharp spiral cord. Then, the growth folds appear. These are much narrower and sharper, and they continue over the spiral cords without forming nodules, at least not on the lower whorls, while on the upper whorls, the strongest cord appears somewhat bead-like.

The spiral cords have the following arrangement: a narrow one runs at the suture. Then, a broad angulation follows after a concavity. An equally broad interspace runs beneath this angulation. This interspace is followed by two further, slightly narrower angulations, which are separated by a narrow interspace. On the area lying beneath this, up to the basal angulation, only two thread-like cords appear.

== Distribution ==
This marine species occurs in the Atlantic Ocean off Southern Brazil and Argentina
