= Drillia pselia =

Scientific classification
- Kingdom: Animalia
- Phylum: Mollusca
- Class: Gastropoda
- Subclass: Caenogastropoda
- Order: Neogastropoda
- Superfamily: Conoidea
- Family: Drilliidae
- Genus: Drillia
- Species: D. pselia

Binomial name
- Drillia pselia Barnard, 1958

Species of gastropod

Drillia pselia is a species of sea snail, a marine gastropod mollusk in the family Drilliidae.

== Description ==
The length of the shell is typically 11 mm and its diameter 4.5 mm.

The species has a sculpture similar to that of the Drillia Lea but is larger and has a larger protoconch.

== Distribution ==
This species occurs in the demersal zone off of Cape Province, South Africa.
