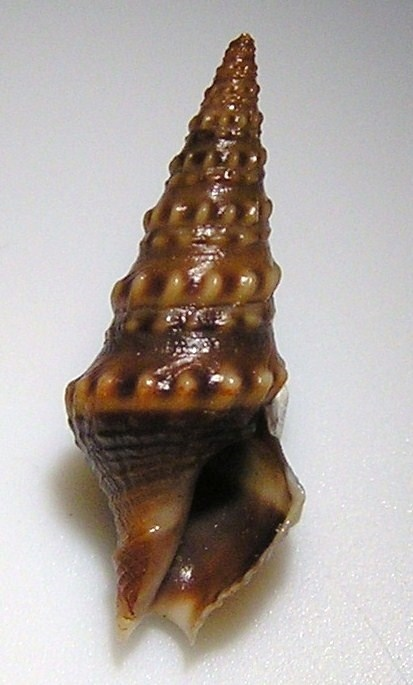
- Apertural view of a shell of Drillia pyramidata

Scientific classification
- Kingdom: Animalia
- Phylum: Mollusca
- Class: Gastropoda
- Subclass: Caenogastropoda
- Order: Neogastropoda
- Superfamily: Conoidea
- Family: Drilliidae
- Genus: Drillia
- Species: D. pyramidata

Binomial name
- Drillia pyramidata (Kiener, 1840)

Synonyms
- Clavatula pyramidata von Maltzan, 1883.; Pleurotoma pyramidata Kiener, 1840

= Drillia pyramidata =

Species of gastropod

Drillia pyramidata is a species of sea snail, a marine gastropod mollusk in the family Drilliidae.

== Description ==
The shell is cerithiiform, strongly corded on the periphery, smooth above it, except a narrow granulated sutural band, below with oblique slight, ribs and revolving striae. The color of the shell is chocolate, the peripheral and sutural nodes whitish. The interior of the aperture is chocolate, with a white band. The length of the shell is 25 mm.

== Distribution ==
This species occurs in the demersal zone of the Atlantic Ocean off West Africa (Senegal, Angola)
