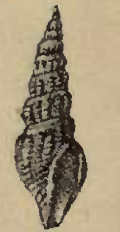
- Drawing of a shell of Drillia ballista

Scientific classification
- Kingdom: Animalia
- Phylum: Mollusca
- Class: Gastropoda
- Subclass: Caenogastropoda
- Order: Neogastropoda
- Superfamily: Conoidea
- Family: Drilliidae
- Genus: Drillia
- Species: D. ballista

Binomial name
- Drillia ballista Von Maltzan, 1883

Synonyms
- Pleurotoma ballista Paetel, 1888

= Drillia ballista =

Species of gastropod

Drillia ballista is a species of sea snail, a marine gastropod mollusk in the family Drilliidae.

== Description ==
The size of an adult shell varies between 11 mm and 22 mm. The shell is wax-yellow. It is narrowly sinuate with the anal sinus pretty deep.

== Distribution ==
This species occurs in the demersal zone of the Atlantic Ocean off West Africa, Guinea
