= Drillia bruuni =

Scientific classification
- Kingdom: Animalia
- Phylum: Mollusca
- Class: Gastropoda
- Subclass: Caenogastropoda
- Order: Neogastropoda
- Superfamily: Conoidea
- Family: Drilliidae
- Genus: Drillia
- Species: D. bruuni

Binomial name
- Drillia bruuni Knudsen, 1952

Species of gastropod

Drillia bruuni is a species of sea snail, a marine gastropod mollusk in the family Drilliidae.

== Distribution ==
This species occurs in the demersal zone of the Atlantic Ocean off West Africa at a depth of 27–29 m.
