= Drillia collina =

Scientific classification
- Kingdom: Animalia
- Phylum: Mollusca
- Class: Gastropoda
- Subclass: Caenogastropoda
- Order: Neogastropoda
- Superfamily: Conoidea
- Family: Drilliidae
- Genus: Drillia
- Species: D. collina

Binomial name
- Drillia collina Barnard, 1958

Species of gastropod

Drillia collina is a species of sea snail, a marine gastropod mollusk in the family Drilliidae.

== Description ==
The length of the shell attains 7 mm, its diameter 3 mm.

== Distribution ==
This species occurs in the Indian Ocean off East London, South Africa at a depth of 58 m.
