= Drillia prattii =

Scientific classification
- Kingdom: Animalia
- Phylum: Mollusca
- Class: Gastropoda
- Subclass: Caenogastropoda
- Order: Neogastropoda
- Superfamily: Conoidea
- Family: Drilliidae
- Genus: Drillia
- Species: D. prattii

Binomial name
- Drillia prattii (E.A. Smith, 1877)

Synonyms
- Pleurotoma (Drillia) prattii E.A. Smith, 1877 (basionym)

Species of gastropod

Drillia prattii is a species of sea snail, a marine gastropod mollusk in the family Drilliidae.

== Description ==
The length of the shell of the shell attains 27 mm, its diameter 8 mm.

The shell has a turreted fusiform shape. It contains 10 whorls. The few rounded oblique ribs, which do not extend to the suture above, and the uniform bright reddish brown or fulvous colour are the characters which chiefly distinguish this species. The aperture is large and equals about half the length of the shell. it is strongly swollen past the lip. The large anal sulcus is broad and lies close to the suture. The sharp outer lip is strongly sulcate. The anal sulcus is moderately deep. The columella is straight, anteriorly attenuated and with very little callus. The siphonal canal is slightly oblique and recurved.
