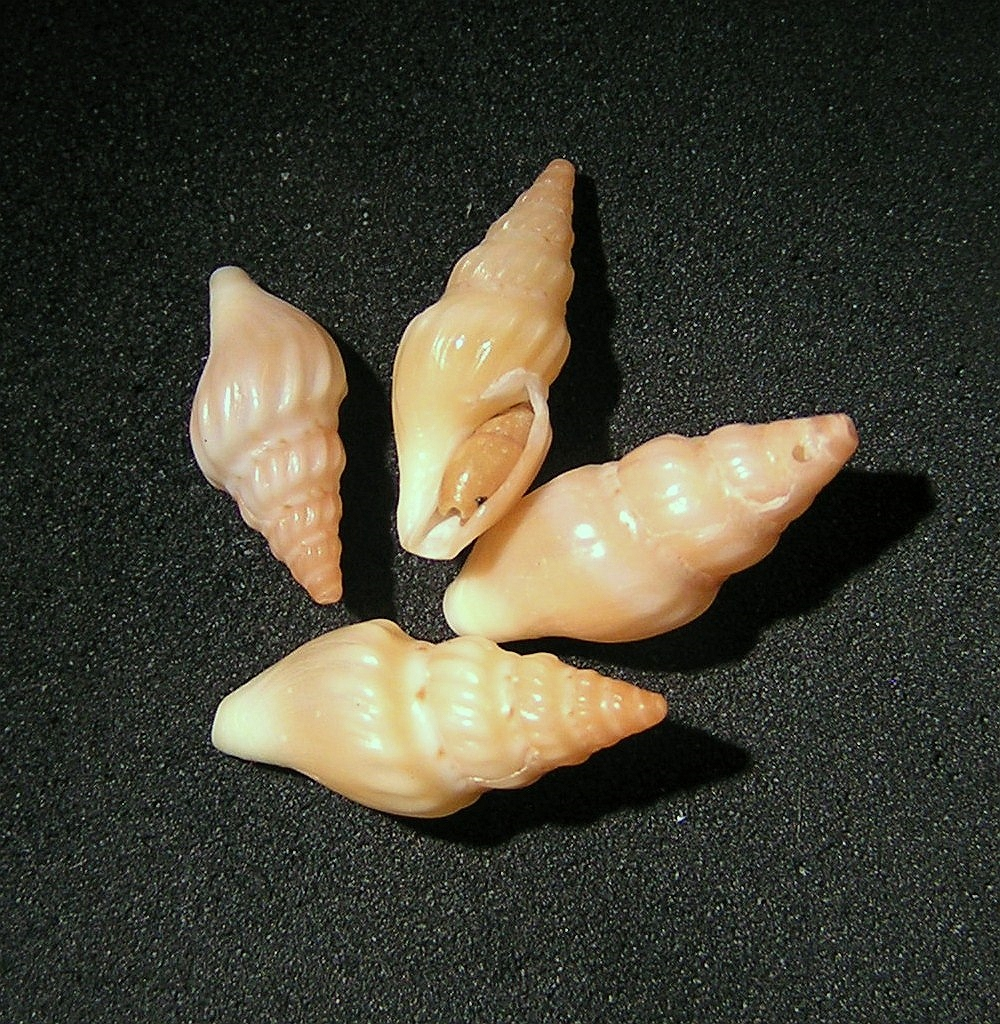

Scientific classification
- Kingdom: Animalia
- Phylum: Mollusca
- Class: Gastropoda
- Subclass: Caenogastropoda
- Order: Neogastropoda
- Superfamily: Conoidea
- Family: Drilliidae
- Genus: Drillia
- Species: D. caffra

Binomial name
- Drillia caffra (E.A. Smith, 1882)

Synonyms
- Austrodrillia caffra Hedley, 1922; Drillia lara Bartsch, P., 1915; Drillia nereia Turton, W.H., 1932; Drillia nivosa Smith, E.A., 1904; Drillia praetermissa E.A. Smith, 1904; Pleurotoma (Clavus) caffra E.A. Smith, 1882 (original description)

= Drillia caffra =

Species of gastropod

Drillia caffra is a species of sea snail, a marine gastropod mollusk in the family Drilliidae.

== Description ==
The size of an adult shell varies between 15 mm and 20 mm.

The shell is subquadrate-ovate. It has a buff color, the remains of the periostracum is dark brown. The upper ribs are white and the shell is dotted with numerous red spots. The protoconch contains 1½-2 whorls, the teleoconch 6 whorls. The shell shows numerous oblique axial ribs, increasing from 11 to 12 on the upper whorls to 15–16 on the body whorl. The oval aperture measures 2/5 of the total length of the shell. The columella is very callous, the upper part is swollen. The siphonal canal is broad and short. The anal sinus is deep and has a parietal callus.

The upper half of each whorl is concave and smooth and slightly thickened at the suture. The lower half is closely ribbed. The thickening below the suture is whitish, closely dotted with red.

== Distribution ==
This species occurs in the demersal zone of the Indian Ocean off the Eastern Cape, Jeffrey's Bay and North Transkei, South Africa.
