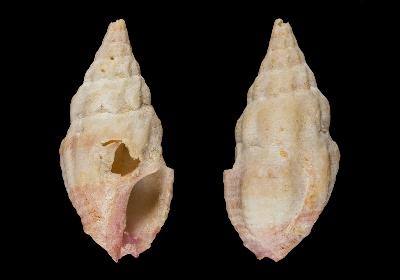
- Shell of Drillia idalinae (specimen at MNHN, Paris)

Scientific classification
- Kingdom: Animalia
- Phylum: Mollusca
- Class: Gastropoda
- Subclass: Caenogastropoda
- Order: Neogastropoda
- Superfamily: Conoidea
- Family: Drilliidae
- Genus: Drillia
- Species: D. idalinae

Binomial name
- Drillia idalinae Bernard & Nicolay, 1984

= Drillia idalinae =

Species of gastropod

Drillia idalinae is a species of sea snail, a marine gastropod mollusk in the family Drilliidae.

== Description ==
The size of an adult shell varies between 20 mm and 35 mm.

== Distribution ==
This species occurs in the demersal zone of the Atlantic Ocean off Gabon and São Tomé and Principe.
