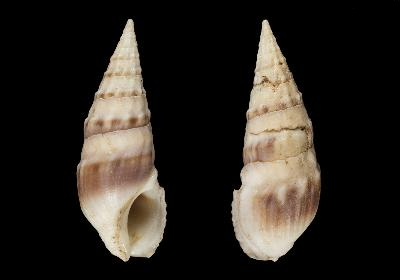
- Shell of Drillia meridiana (holotype in the MNHN, Paris)

Scientific classification
- Kingdom: Animalia
- Phylum: Mollusca
- Class: Gastropoda
- Subclass: Caenogastropoda
- Order: Neogastropoda
- Superfamily: Conoidea
- Family: Drilliidae
- Genus: Drillia
- Species: D. meridiana

Binomial name
- Drillia meridiana Perugia & Prelle, 2012

= Drillia meridiana =

Species of gastropod

Drillia meridiana is a species of sea snail, a marine gastropod mollusc in the family Drilliidae.

== Distribution ==
This marine species occurs off South Madagascar.
