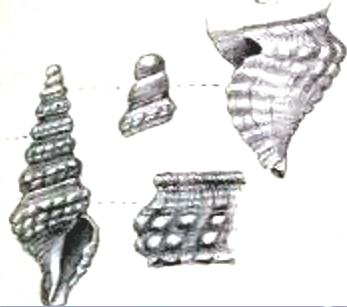
- Original image of a shell of Drillia janseni with close-ups of the protoconch, a whorl and the body whorl.

Scientific classification
- Kingdom: Animalia
- Phylum: Mollusca
- Class: Gastropoda
- Subclass: Caenogastropoda
- Order: Neogastropoda
- Superfamily: Conoidea
- Family: Drilliidae
- Genus: Drillia
- Species: D. janseni

Binomial name
- Drillia janseni Strebel, 1905

= Drillia janseni =

Species of gastropod

Drillia janseni is a species of sea snail, a marine gastropod mollusk in the family Drilliidae.

== Description ==
The length of the shell attains 15 mm, its diameter 5.8 mm.

The rather solid shell has a turriform shape. it is white, covered with a dirty yellowish, slightly fibrous cuticle. It contains 8½ whorls separated by a narrow suture. The two whorls of the protoconch are blunt, smooth and shining. The next whorls are gradually increasing in size. The oblique, acute, longitudinal ribs form nodules when crossed by spiral irae. The narrow oval aperture tapers anteriorly into a point and posteriorly gradually turning into a narrow, recurved and rather long siphonal canal

== Distribution ==
This marine species occurs off Chile and Argentina.
