= Drillia phymaticus =

Scientific classification
- Kingdom: Animalia
- Phylum: Mollusca
- Class: Gastropoda
- Subclass: Caenogastropoda
- Order: Neogastropoda
- Superfamily: Conoidea
- Family: Drilliidae
- Genus: Drillia
- Species: D. phymaticus

Binomial name
- Drillia phymaticus R.B. Watson, 1885

Species of gastropod

Drillia phymaticus is a species of sea snail, a marine gastropod mollusk in the family Drilliidae.

== Distribution ==
This marine species occurs off Japan.
