= Drillia tumida =

Scientific classification
- Kingdom: Animalia
- Phylum: Mollusca
- Class: Gastropoda
- Subclass: Caenogastropoda
- Order: Neogastropoda
- Superfamily: Conoidea
- Family: Drilliidae
- Genus: Drillia
- Species: D. tumida

Binomial name
- Drillia tumida McLean & Poorman, 1971

Species of gastropod

Drillia tumida is a species of sea snail, a marine gastropod mollusk in the family Drilliidae.

== Description ==
The shell grows to a length of 14 mm.

== Distribution ==
This species occurs in the demersal zone of the tropical Eastern Pacific Ocean from Mexico to Panama.
