= Drillia investigatoris =

Scientific classification
- Kingdom: Animalia
- Phylum: Mollusca
- Class: Gastropoda
- Subclass: Caenogastropoda
- Order: Neogastropoda
- Superfamily: Conoidea
- Family: Drilliidae
- Genus: Drillia
- Species: D. investigatoris

Binomial name
- Drillia investigatoris E.A. Smith, 1899

Synonyms
- Brachytoma investigatoris (E.A. Smith, 1899)

Species of gastropod

Drillia investigatoris is a species of sea snail, a marine gastropod mollusk in the family Drilliidae.

== Description ==
The length of the shell attains 65 mm, its diameter 20 mm.

The reddish-brown shell has a fusiform shape. It shows a pale band above the middle of the whorl. The longitudinal ribs are strongly rounded. They do not extend beyond the middle of the body whorl. These ribs are crossed by many spiral lirae. The shell contains 12 whorls, two of which in the protoconch. These two are smooth, white and globose. The others are slightly concave above the suture and then slightly obtuse. The aperture is narrow and measures almost half the length of the shell. The outer lip is sinuate close to the suture. The columella is straight and oblique.

== Distribution ==
This species occurs in the demersal zone off the Andaman Islands.
