= Drillia captiva =

Scientific classification
- Kingdom: Animalia
- Phylum: Mollusca
- Class: Gastropoda
- Subclass: Caenogastropoda
- Order: Neogastropoda
- Superfamily: Conoidea
- Family: Drilliidae
- Genus: Drillia
- Species: D. captiva

Binomial name
- Drillia captiva E.A. Smith, 1899

Species of gastropod

Drillia captiva is a species of sea snail, a marine gastropod mollusk in the family Drilliidae.

== Description ==
The length of the shell attains 21 mm, its diameter 6.5 mm.

The pale shell has a short fusiform shape. The spire is elongate and acuminate. It shows a pale band above the middle of the whorl. The shell contains about 10 whorls, The others are slightly concave above the suture and then slightly convex or almost flat. The whorls are crossed by 14-16 oblique longitudinal ribs. Very fine spiral striae, crossed by equally fine lines of growth, are observable under a powerful lens. The oblique aperture has an irregular shape. The siphonal canal is short. The outer lip is varicose and strongly sinuate at its top. The columella is almost straight and has a thin callus.

== Distribution ==
This species occurs in the demersal zone off the Andaman Islands.
