= Drillia asra =

Scientific classification
- Kingdom: Animalia
- Phylum: Mollusca
- Class: Gastropoda
- Subclass: Caenogastropoda
- Order: Neogastropoda
- Superfamily: Conoidea
- Family: Drilliidae
- Genus: Drillia
- Species: D. asra

Binomial name
- Drillia asra Thiele, 1925

Species of sea snail

Drillia asra is a species of sea snail, a marine gastropod mollusk in the family Drilliidae.

== Distribution ==
This species occurs in the demersal zone of the Indian Ocean off Zanzibar, found at a depths of 463 m.
