= Drillia sikesi =

Scientific classification
- Kingdom: Animalia
- Phylum: Mollusca
- Class: Gastropoda
- Subclass: Caenogastropoda
- Order: Neogastropoda
- Superfamily: Conoidea
- Family: Drilliidae
- Genus: Drillia
- Species: D. sikesi

Binomial name
- Drillia sikesi H.B. Preston, 1908

Species of gastropod

Drillia sikesi is a species of sea snail, a marine gastropod mollusk in the family Drilliidae.

== Description ==
The length of the shell attains 31 mm, its diameter 14 mm.

(Original description) The solid shell is imperforate and acuminately fusiform. It is chalky white, painted with a broad, pale brown, infra-peripheral band. It contains 10 whorls. The upper ones are much eroded, the lower bearing a row of coarse tubercles at the periphery. The solid, white columella descends abruptly. The anal sinus is broad. The peristome is thin and irregularly serrated. The aperture is oval. The interior of shell is white.

== Distribution ==
This marine species occurs off the Andaman Islands
