= Drillia monodi =

Scientific classification
- Kingdom: Animalia
- Phylum: Mollusca
- Class: Gastropoda
- Subclass: Caenogastropoda
- Order: Neogastropoda
- Superfamily: Conoidea
- Family: Drilliidae
- Genus: Drillia
- Species: D. monodi

Binomial name
- Drillia monodi Knudsen, 1952

Species of gastropod

Drillia monodi is a species of sea snail, a marine gastropod mollusk in the family Drilliidae.

== Description ==
Like most sea snails, this species has a shell used to surround and protect its soft body.

== Distribution ==
This species is found in the demersal zone of the Atlantic Ocean off West Africa at a depth of 144 m.
