= Drillia bruchia =

Scientific classification
- Kingdom: Animalia
- Phylum: Mollusca
- Class: Gastropoda
- Subclass: Caenogastropoda
- Order: Neogastropoda
- Superfamily: Conoidea
- Family: Drilliidae
- Genus: Drillia
- Species: D. bruchia

Binomial name
- Drillia bruchia Barnard, 1958

Species of gastropod

Drillia bruchia is a species of sea snail, a marine gastropod mollusk in the family Drilliidae.

== Description ==
This species is only known from a broken specimen.

Their functional group is Benthos.

Their feeding type is predatory.

== Distribution ==
This species occurs in the demersal zone of the Indian Ocean off Cape Natal, Durban, South Africa at a depth of 800 m.
