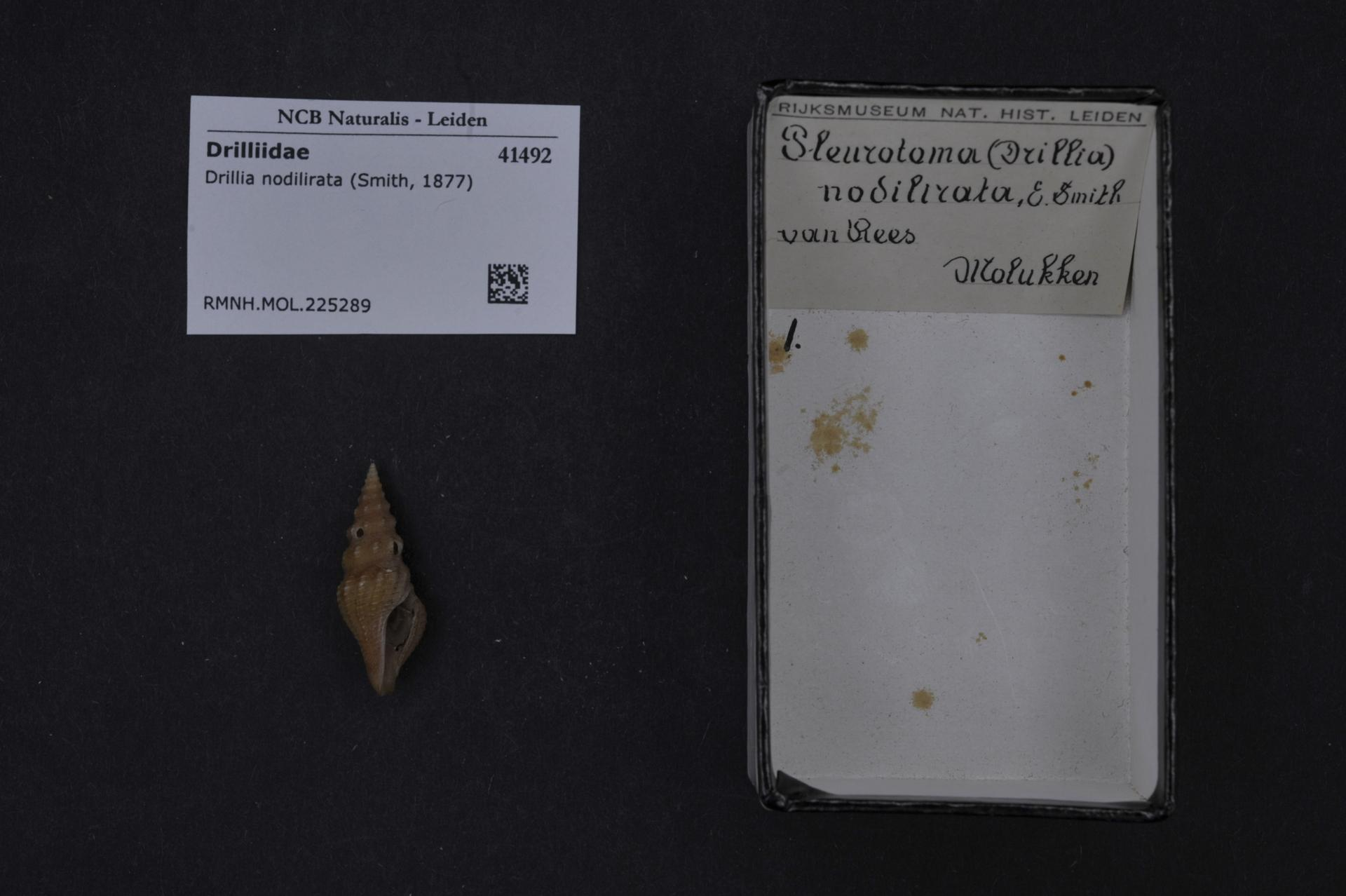
- Drillia nodilirata shell

Scientific classification
- Kingdom: Animalia
- Phylum: Mollusca
- Class: Gastropoda
- Subclass: Caenogastropoda
- Order: Neogastropoda
- Superfamily: Conoidea
- Family: Drilliidae
- Genus: Drillia
- Species: D. nodilirata

Binomial name
- Drillia nodilirata (E.A. Smith, 1877)

Synonyms
- Pleurotoma (Drillia) nodilirata E.A. Smith, 1877 (basionym)

= Drillia nodilirata =

Species of gastropod

Drillia nodilirata is a species of sea snail, a marine gastropod mollusk in the family Drilliidae.

== Description ==
The length of the shell of the shell attains 25 mm, its diameter 8 mm.

The white, corneous shell has a turreted fusiform shape. It contains 11 whorls, The spiral lirations in this species are particularly prominent, especially upon the ribs, where in the body whorl they are developed into little nodules. The narrow, oval aperture measures about half the length of the shell. The sharp outer lip is strongly sulcate. The anal sulcus is moderately deep. The columella is straight, with a thick callus. The siphonal canal is narrow and recurved.

== Distribution ==
This marine species occurs off the Philippines.
