= Drillia adusta =

Scientific classification
- Kingdom: Animalia
- Phylum: Mollusca
- Class: Gastropoda
- Subclass: Caenogastropoda
- Order: Neogastropoda
- Superfamily: Conoidea
- Family: Drilliidae
- Genus: Drillia
- Species: D. adusta

Binomial name
- Drillia adusta (Sowerby I, 1834)

Synonyms
- Pleurotoma adusta G.B. Sowerby I, 1834 (nomen dubium)

Species of gastropod

Drillia adusta is a species of sea snail, a marine gastropod mollusk in the family Drilliidae.

== Description ==
(Original description in Latin) The shell istapering to a point (pyramid-shaped) and is brown (or dusky).

It has ten whorls, which are flattened above, with tubercles (or knobs) in the middle, with the tubercles being somewhat compressed longitudinally. The body whorl is grooved with granules below. The aperture is short, [with] a posterior sinus (or notch). The siphonal canal is very short.

== Distribution ==
This species occurs in the demersal zone of the Pacific Ocean off Colombia.
