= Drillia fijiensis =

Scientific classification
- Kingdom: Animalia
- Phylum: Mollusca
- Class: Gastropoda
- Subclass: Caenogastropoda
- Order: Neogastropoda
- Superfamily: Conoidea
- Family: Drilliidae
- Genus: Drillia
- Species: D. fijiensis

Binomial name
- Drillia fijiensis (E.A. Smith, 1888)

Synonyms
- Pleurotoma (Drillia) fijiensis E.A. Smith, 1888

Species of gastropod

Drillia fijiensis is a species of sea snail, a marine gastropod mollusc in the family Drilliidae.

== Description ==
The length of the shell attains 11.5 mm, its diameter 3.5 mm.

The white fusiform shell contains 9 whorls, of which two dull, shining whorls in the protoconch. The other whorls are convex with oblique, acute, longitudinal ribs (11 in the body whorl). Three spiral lirae form nodules when crossing the ribs. The body whorl contains about 15 spiral lirae, but only the upper three are nodulose. The oval aperture measures 10/23 of the total length of the shell. The short siphonal canal is recurved and inclined to the right. The anal sinus is large and deep. The columella is slightly angled and shows a callus. The transverse yellow bands are so very pale as to be scarcely visible; in one example they are quite obsolete.

== Distribution ==
This marine species occurs off Fiji.
