= Drillia cratista =

Scientific classification
- Kingdom: Animalia
- Phylum: Mollusca
- Class: Gastropoda
- Subclass: Caenogastropoda
- Order: Neogastropoda
- Superfamily: Conoidea
- Family: Drilliidae
- Genus: Drillia
- Species: D. cratista

Binomial name
- Drillia cratista Melvill, J.C., 1927

Species of gastropod

Drillia cratista is a species of sea snail, a marine gastropod mollusk in the family Drilliidae.

== Distribution ==
This species occurs in the Caribbean Sea off Jamaica.
