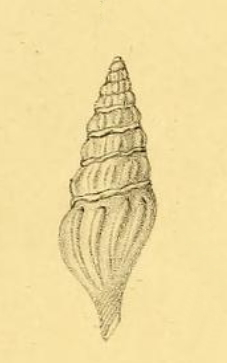
- Shell of † Drillia inexspectata (original drawing)

Scientific classification
- Kingdom: Animalia
- Phylum: Mollusca
- Class: Gastropoda
- Subclass: Caenogastropoda
- Order: Neogastropoda
- Superfamily: Conoidea
- Family: Drilliidae
- Genus: Drillia
- Species: †D. inexspectata

Binomial name
- †Drillia inexspectata (Martin K., 1895)

Synonyms
- † Pleurotoma (Drillia) inexspectata K. Martin, 1895

= Drillia inexspectata =

Species of gastropod

Drillia inexspectata is an extinct species of sea snail, a marine gastropod mollusk in the family Drilliidae.

== Description ==
(Original description in German) The shell is spindle-shaped, with an aperture less than half its total length. It comprises two smooth, embryonic whorls and six median whorls, entirely devoid of any intervening sculpture.

The median whorls display an S-shaped profile, characterized by a deep posterior depression and a pronounced anterior curvature. These whorls bear robust transverse ribs that align almost with the shell's axis. These ribs are confined to the curved sections of the whorls and manifest as elongated, anteriorly swelling nodes on the oldest parts of the shell. On the younger shell portions, a narrow, sharply defined band emerges at the posterior suture. Longitudinal sculpture is entirely absent.

On the body whorl, the transverse ribs are curved, extending beyond the midline towards the anterior, ultimately reaching a narrowed frontal section densely covered with fine spiral ridges. Approximately one whorl's distance from the aperture, the body whorl features a prominent transverse callus. Just anterior to the suture line, several very fine spirals traverse the ribs, gradually merging into the ridges of the frontal section.

The inner lip is well-developed, rising distinctly with a sharp edge from the columella, while posteriorly it thickens into a callus. The outer lip is absent; however, delicate growth lines indicate the presence of a shallow, rounded incision within the whorl's depression. The columella is simple and straight.

== Distribution ==
This marine species occurs off Java, Indonesia.
