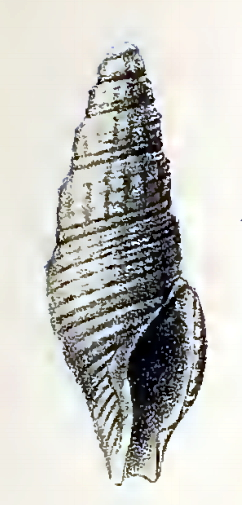
- Original image of a shell of Drillia audax

Scientific classification
- Kingdom: Animalia
- Phylum: Mollusca
- Class: Gastropoda
- Subclass: Caenogastropoda
- Order: Neogastropoda
- Superfamily: Conoidea
- Family: Drilliidae
- Genus: Drillia
- Species: D. audax

Binomial name
- Drillia audax Melvill & Standen, 1903

= Drillia audax =

Species of mollusc

Drillia audax is a species of sea snail, a marine gastropod mollusk in the family Drilliidae.

== Description ==
The length of the shell attains 9.25 mm, its diameter 2.5 mm.

A little whitish species of oblong fusiform shape and of bold contour. It is very distinct in both sculpture and painting of the spiral straw-coloured lirae surrounding the 7 whorls, which are not costulate. One spiral lira, acute and prominent, is especially noticeable at the base of each whorl, just above the sutures. The aperture is ovate-oblong with a distinctive wide sinus. The siphonal canal is wide and very short.

== Distribution ==
This species occurs in the demersal zone of the Gulf of Oman, found at a depth of 284 m.
