= Drillia dakarensis =

Scientific classification
- Kingdom: Animalia
- Phylum: Mollusca
- Class: Gastropoda
- Subclass: Caenogastropoda
- Order: Neogastropoda
- Superfamily: Conoidea
- Family: Drilliidae
- Genus: Drillia
- Species: D. dakarensis

Binomial name
- Drillia dakarensis Knudsen, 1956

Species of mollusc

Drillia dakarensis is a species of sea snail, a marine gastropod mollusk in the family Drilliidae.

== Description ==
The shell grows to a length of 12 mm. The snail lives in marine habitat and produces marine sediment. This snail is a predator and its shell contains calcium carbonate.

== Distribution ==
This species occurs in the demersal zone of the Atlantic Ocean off Western Africa (Cape Verde, Senegal, and Ghana).
