= Drillia knudseni =

Scientific classification
- Kingdom: Animalia
- Phylum: Mollusca
- Class: Gastropoda
- Subclass: Caenogastropoda
- Order: Neogastropoda
- Superfamily: Conoidea
- Family: Drilliidae
- Genus: Drillia
- Species: D. knudseni

Binomial name
- Drillia knudseni Tippett, 2006

Synonyms
- Drillia dunkeri Knudsen, 1952

Species of gastropod

Drillia knudseni is a species of predatory sea snail, a marine gastropod mollusc in the family Drilliidae.

== Distribution ==
The snail can be found in the South Atlantic Ocean off the coast of Africa, from south of the Gulf of Guinea to the ocean west of Angola.
