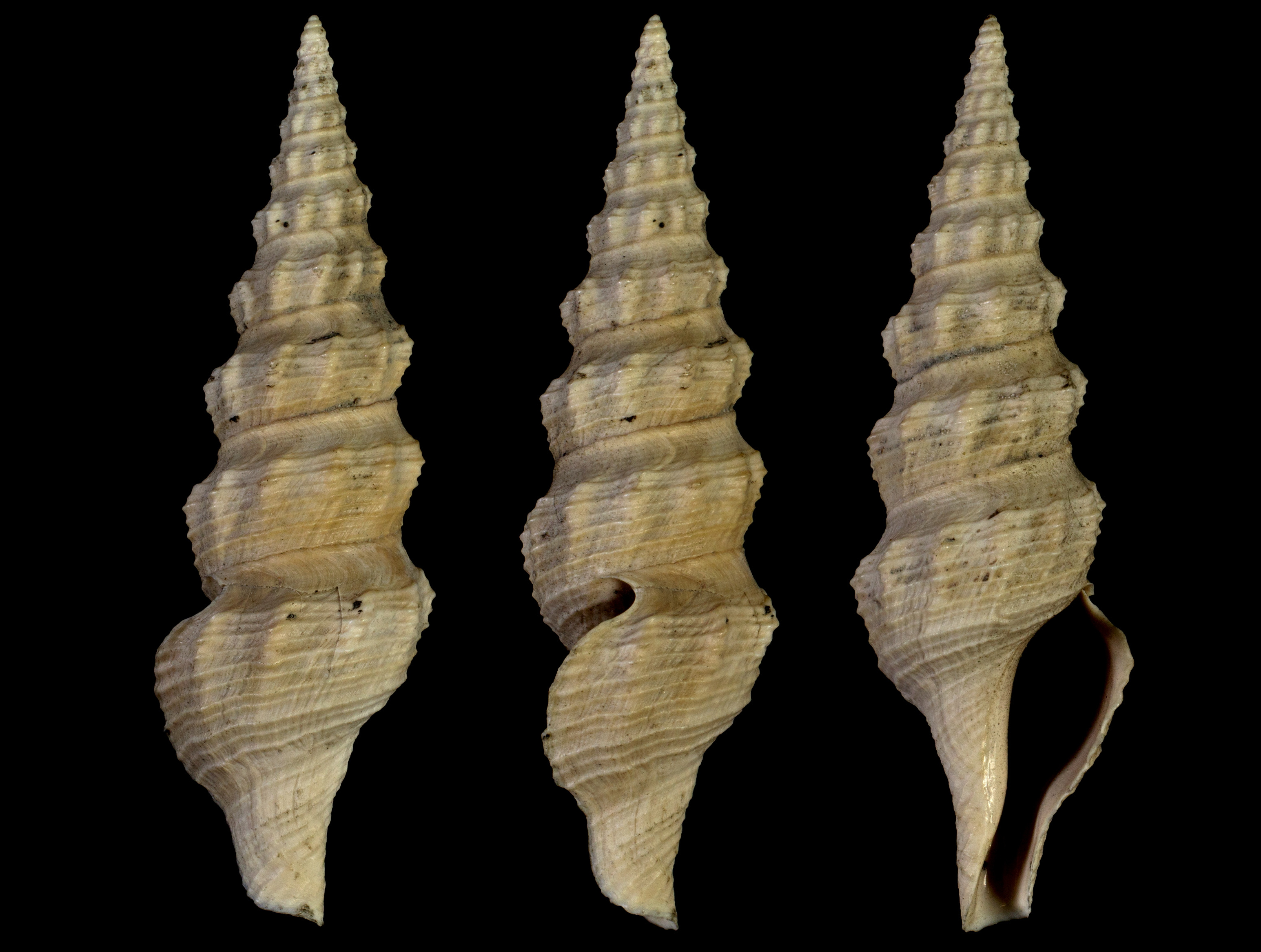
- Shells of Drillia allionii (specimens at MNHN, Paris)

Scientific classification
- Kingdom: Animalia
- Phylum: Mollusca
- Class: Gastropoda
- Subclass: Caenogastropoda
- Order: Neogastropoda
- Superfamily: Conoidea
- Family: Drilliidae
- Genus: Drillia
- Species: D. allionii

Binomial name
- Drillia allionii Bellardi 1877

= Drillia allionii =

Extinct species of gastropod

Drillia allionii is an extinct species of sea snail, a marine gastropod mollusk in the family Drilliidae.

== Distribution ==
Fossils of this species have been found in Pliocene strata of Greece and Italy, and in Miocene strata of Greece; age range: 11.608 to 2.588 Ma.
