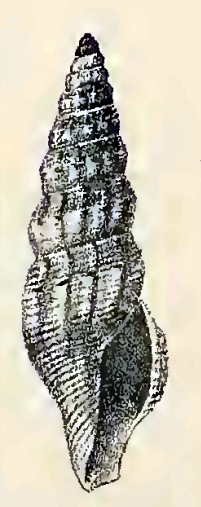
- Original image of a shell of Drillia dives

Scientific classification
- Kingdom: Animalia
- Phylum: Mollusca
- Class: Gastropoda
- Subclass: Caenogastropoda
- Order: Neogastropoda
- Superfamily: Conoidea
- Family: Drilliidae
- Genus: Drillia
- Species: D. dives

Binomial name
- Drillia dives Melvill, J.C. & R. Standen, 1903

= Drillia dives =

Species of gastropod

Drillia dives is a species of sea snail, a marine gastropod mollusk in the family Drilliidae.

== Description ==
The length of this shell attains 23 mm, its diameter 5 mm.

The slender, fusiform, delicate shell has a white-gray color. It contains ten whorls of which three in the protoconch. These are brown and completely hyaline. The other whorls are impressed in the suture and ventricose. Eleven longitudinally oblique ribs run as deep as the body whorl. They are spirally striate, above and next to the sutures. The aperture is oblong. The lip is slightly thickened. The anal sinus is wide but not deep. The siphonal canal is short.

== Distribution ==
This marine species occurs in the Persian Gulf; the Gulf of Oman and the Arabian Sea
