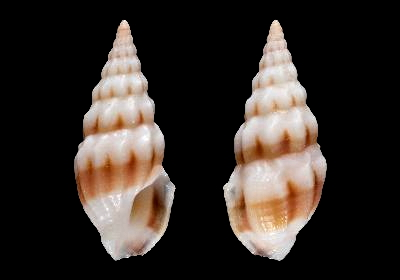
- Shell of Drillia ghyooti (holotype at MNHN, Paris)

Scientific classification
- Kingdom: Animalia
- Phylum: Mollusca
- Class: Gastropoda
- Subclass: Caenogastropoda
- Order: Neogastropoda
- Superfamily: Conoidea
- Family: Drilliidae
- Genus: Drillia
- Species: D. ghyooti

Binomial name
- Drillia ghyooti Nolf, 2008

= Drillia ghyooti =

Species of gastropod

Drillia ghyooti is a species of sea snail, a marine gastropod mollusc in the family Drilliidae.

== Description ==
The shell of an adult shell varies between 10 mm and 17 mm.

== Distribution ==
This marine species occurs off the Ivory Coast and São Tomé and Principe.
