= Drillia katiae =

Scientific classification
- Kingdom: Animalia
- Phylum: Mollusca
- Class: Gastropoda
- Subclass: Caenogastropoda
- Order: Neogastropoda
- Superfamily: Conoidea
- Family: Drilliidae
- Genus: Drillia
- Species: D. katiae

Binomial name
- Drillia katiae Nolf, 2006

Species of gastropod

Drillia katiae is a species of sea snail, a marine gastropod mollusc in the family Drilliidae.

== Distribution ==
This species occurs in the Atlantic Ocean off Gabon.
