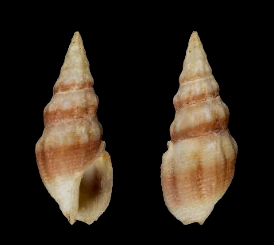
- Drawing of a shell of Drillia umbilicata (holotype at MNHN, Paris)

Scientific classification
- Kingdom: Animalia
- Phylum: Mollusca
- Class: Gastropoda
- Subclass: Caenogastropoda
- Order: Neogastropoda
- Superfamily: Conoidea
- Family: Drilliidae
- Genus: Drillia
- Species: D. umbilicata

Binomial name
- Drillia umbilicata Gray, 1838

Synonyms
- Clavus dunkeri Weinkauff, H.C. & W. Kobelt, 1875; Clavus (Drillia) dunkeri Wenz, 1943; Crassispira dunkeri von Maltzan, 1883; Crassispira saulcydiana (C.A. Récluz, 1851); Drillia saulcydianum (Récluz, C., 1851); Drillia (Brachystoma) dunkeri Tryon, 1884; Pleurotoma saulcydianum Récluz, 1851; Pleurotoma umbilicata Reeve, 1843

= Drillia umbilicata =

Species of gastropod

Drillia umbilicata is a species of sea snail, a marine gastropod mollusk in the family Drilliidae.

== Description ==
The shell grows to a length of 32 mm. The shell is light yellowish brown or yellowish white. It shows prominent, distant ribs, forming a strongly tuberculate shoulder, and revolving striae. The anal sinus is produced upwards. The inner lip is thickened below, forming with the axis a false umbilicus.

== Distribution ==
This species occurs in the demersal zone of the Atlantic Ocean off Sierra Leone and from Gabon to Angola.
