= Drillia kophameli =

Scientific classification
- Kingdom: Animalia
- Phylum: Mollusca
- Class: Gastropoda
- Subclass: Caenogastropoda
- Order: Neogastropoda
- Superfamily: Conoidea
- Family: Drilliidae
- Genus: Drillia
- Species: D. kophameli

Binomial name
- Drillia kophameli Strebel, 1905

Species of gastropod

Drillia kophameli is a species of sea snail, a marine gastropod mollusk in the family Drilliidae.

== Description ==
The shell grows to a length of 9.5 mm.

== Distribution ==
This species occurs in the demersal zone of the Strait of Magellan.
