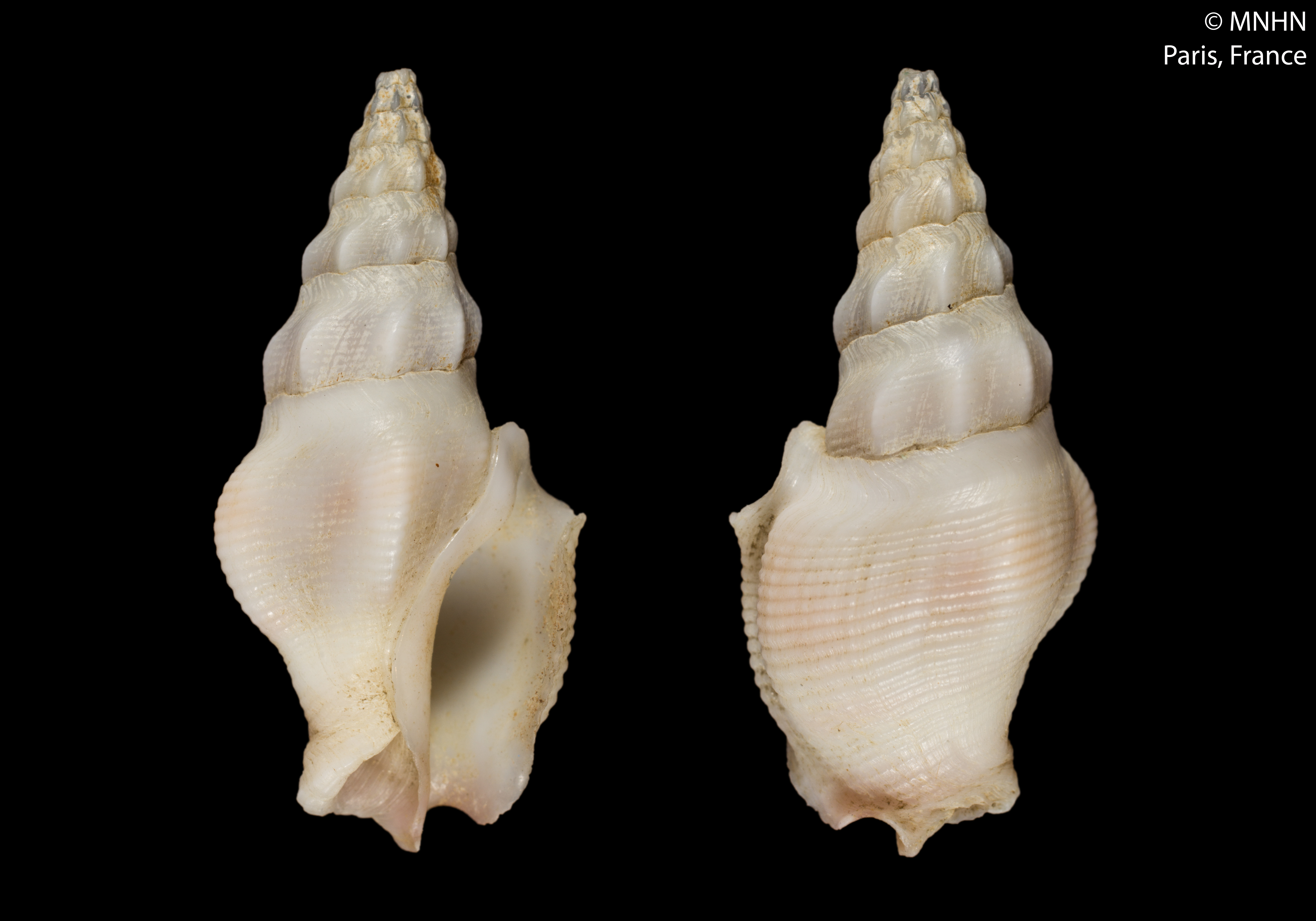

Scientific classification
- Kingdom: Animalia
- Phylum: Mollusca
- Class: Gastropoda
- Subclass: Caenogastropoda
- Order: Neogastropoda
- Superfamily: Conoidea
- Family: Drilliidae
- Genus: Drillia
- Species: D. patriciae

Binomial name
- Drillia patriciae Bernard & Nicolay, 1984

= Drillia patriciae =

Species of gastropod

Drillia patriciae is a species of sea snail, a marine gastropod mollusk in the family Drilliidae.

== Description ==
The length of an adult shell varies between 25 mm and 30 mm.

== Distribution ==
This species occurs in the demersal zone of the Atlantic Ocean off Gabon at depths between 20 mm and 50 mm.
