= Drillia capta =

Scientific classification
- Kingdom: Animalia
- Phylum: Mollusca
- Class: Gastropoda
- Subclass: Caenogastropoda
- Order: Neogastropoda
- Superfamily: Conoidea
- Family: Drilliidae
- Genus: Drillia
- Species: D. capta

Binomial name
- Drillia capta E.A. Smith, 1899

Species of gastropod

Drillia capta is a species of sea snail, a marine gastropod mollusk in the family Drilliidae.

== Description ==
The length of the shell attains 19 mm, its diameter 6 mm.

The pale shell has a short fusiform shape. The spire is elongate and acuminate. The shell contains about 11-12 whorls, These are slightly concave above the suture and then slightly convex or almost flat. The whorls are crossed by 12 oblique longitudinal ribs. Very fine spiral striae, crossed by equally fine lines of growth, are observable under a powerful lens. The small aperture measures about 1/3 of the total length of the shell. The siphonal canal is short and recurved. The outer lip is varicose and strongly sinuate at its top. The columella is almost straight and has a thin callus.

This species is remarkable on account of the fine transverse striae which cover the entire surface, also for the prominent columellar callus and the deep rounded sinus of the labrum. The upper ends of the ribs are cut off by a shallow groove or depression.

== Distribution ==
This species occurs in the demersal zone off the Andaman Islands.
