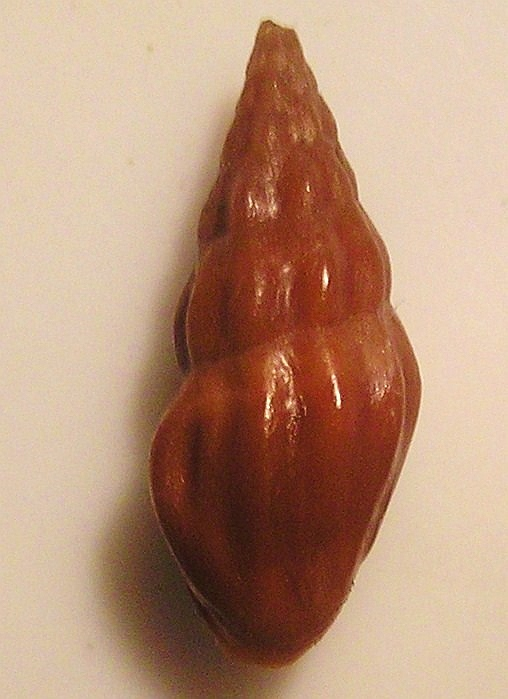

Scientific classification
- Kingdom: Animalia
- Phylum: Mollusca
- Class: Gastropoda
- Subclass: Caenogastropoda
- Order: Neogastropoda
- Superfamily: Conoidea
- Family: Drilliidae
- Genus: Drillia
- Species: D. quadrasi

Binomial name
- Drillia quadrasi Böttger, O., 1895

= Drillia quadrasi =

Species of gastropod

Drillia quadrasi is a species of sea snail, a marine gastropod mollusk in the family Drilliidae.

== Description ==
The length of the shell of the shell varies between 9 mm and 16½ mm; its diameter attains 6½ mm.

(Original description in Latin) The shell is elongated-spindle-shaped and very solid. It is shiny, and bright reddish or chestnut-colored. Sometimes it is adorned with a lighter, rather indistinct spiral band following an incision below the suture. The spire is exactly turreted, and the apex is very sharp.

The 10 whorls are somewhat stepped, slightly constricted and pressed close at the rather shallow suture, and convex underneath. They are ornamented with dull, somewhat vertical, convex ribs — 9-10 on the penultimate whorl — otherwise they are smooth. The body whorl is somewhat swollen above, narrowed below, and girdled at the base by about 7 ridges. It is equipped with a vertical rib located before the aperture that is much stronger than the others, and is almost equal to 3/7 of the shell's height.

The aperture is narrow and somewhat triangular, pointed at the base, chestnut-colored with white within the opening. It has a wide and deep incision, separated from the suture by a thick threshold bearing a semiglobular nodule. The right lip is acute, strongly extended in an arc, and again emarginated at the base, smooth on the inside. The columella is straight, narrow, and smooth. The siphonal canal is almost absent, very short, and extends to the right.

== Distribution ==
This marine species occurs off the Philippines.
