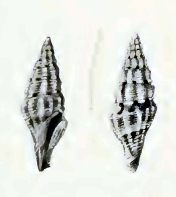
- Original image of a shell of Drillia rubrozonata

Scientific classification
- Kingdom: Animalia
- Phylum: Mollusca
- Class: Gastropoda
- Subclass: Caenogastropoda
- Order: Neogastropoda
- Superfamily: Conoidea
- Family: Drilliidae
- Genus: Drillia
- Species: D. rubrozonata

Binomial name
- Drillia rubrozonata Schepman, M.M., 1913

= Drillia rubrozonata =

Species of gastropod

Drillia rubrozonata is a species of sea snail, a marine gastropod mollusk in the family Drilliidae.

== Description ==
The length of the shell attains 12 mm, its diameter 4 mm.

(Original description) The small shell is rather broadly fusiform, with a moderately long spire, subpellucid. It is whitish, painted with purplish red-brown. It contains 9 whorls, of which about 3 form a smooth protoconch, with slightly convex sides and 3 or 4 ribs at the end of last nuclear whorl. The whorls of the teleoconch are convex, separatecl by an undulated suture, with rather thick, rounded ribs, 9 or 10 in number on the penultimate whorl. These ribs occupy the whole space of the upper whorls. They are slightly angular below a narrow infrasutural excavation, especially on the body whorl and become less distinct on the base of the body whorl, where they disappear at last on the siphonal canal. Of the spirals firstly a strong one, with oblong nodules corresponding to the ribs, border the suture, it is accompanied by a much finer one in the excavation, 3 rather strong spirals cross the lower part of each whorl, and amount to about 1 7 on the body whorl and siphonal canal, with eventually a narrow intermediate one in the interstices of the body whorl. The shell has moreover strong, riblike growth-striae, making the interstices of the ribs somewhat granular. The red-brown colour appears in the interstices of the nodules of subsutural rib, and between the ribs in the excavation, forming on the lower part of the body whorl, 2 more or less distinct bands, one at the periphery, the other at the base of the body whorl. The base of the siphonal canal is of the same colour, which in some instances occupies nearly the whorl between two ribs. The aperture is oval, with a broad, rather shallow anus at the suture and a very shallow one near the limit of the siphonal canal. The peristome is thin. The columellar side with a at the suture, then becomes slightly concave, running nearly straight in the rather short, wide canaI.The interior of the aperture is light violet, with the brown bands of the exterior more or less visible, on the columellar side, which is rather strongly enamelled.

== Distribution ==
This marine species occurs off Timor.
