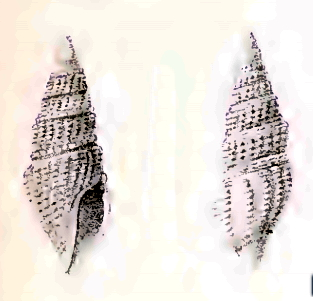
- Original image of a shell of Drillia ochroleuca

Scientific classification
- Kingdom: Animalia
- Phylum: Mollusca
- Class: Gastropoda
- Subclass: Caenogastropoda
- Order: Neogastropoda
- Superfamily: Conoidea
- Family: Drilliidae
- Genus: Drillia
- Species: D. ochroleuca

Binomial name
- Drillia ochroleuca (J.C. Melvill & E.R. Sykes, 1897)

Synonyms
- Pleurotoma (Drilia) ochroleuca Melvill, J.C. & Sykes, E.R., 1897

= Drillia ochroleuca =

Species of gastropod

Drillia ochroleuca is a species of sea snail, a marine gastropod mollusk in the family Drilliidae.

== Description ==
The length of the shell attains 22 mm, its diameter 6 mm.

The brightly coloured species is ochraceous-yellow. The shell is adorned with closely arranged, spiral, white gemmules. it contains 9 whorls, the apical white and simple, the lower whorls impressed at the sutures, below which is a spiral keel, and this is followed by a transverse depressed sulcation. The first three rows of gemmules following on the penultimate whorl and the body whorl seem almost confluent, producing the appearance of longitudinal riblets. The aperture is narrow and oblong. The outer lip is somewhat thickened. The anal sinus is conspicuous, and the columellar margin is straight.

== Distribution ==
This marine species is found off the Andaman Islands.
