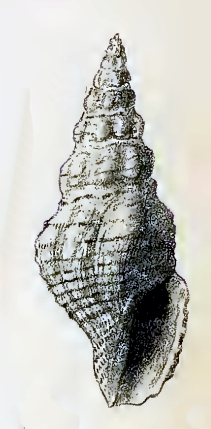
- Original image of a shell of Crassispira latiriformis

Scientific classification
- Kingdom: Animalia
- Phylum: Mollusca
- Class: Gastropoda
- Subclass: Caenogastropoda
- Order: Neogastropoda
- Superfamily: Conoidea
- Family: Pseudomelatomidae
- Genus: Crassispira
- Species: C. latiriformis

Binomial name
- Crassispira latiriformis (Melvill, 1923)

Synonyms
- Drillia latiriformis Melvill, 1923

= Crassispira latiriformis =

Species of gastropod

Crassispira latiriformis is a species of sea snail, a marine gastropod mollusk in the family Pseudomelatomidae.

== Description ==
The length of the shell attains 17 mm, its diameter 6 mm.

(Original description) The fusiform shell has a fairly broadened body whorl, but a very attenuate spire It contains 9 whorls, of which the two whorls in the protoconch are smooth, diaphanous, and globular. The remainder show strong, rounded, shining, nodulous longitudinal ribs, about eight in number on the penultimate and body whorls. The suture is strongly raised-plicate, and spirally furnished with regular raised revolving lines, chestnut in colour, thus contrasting with the paler ochreous brown surface. These raised striae are very close and frequent on the body whorl, especially below the periphery. The aperture is oblong. The outer lip somewhat thin, with a sinus rather broad and deep. The columellar margin is oblique. The siphonal canal is abbreviate.

== Distribution ==
This marine species occurs off New Caledonia
