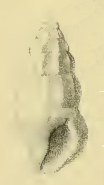
- Original image of a shell of Clavus cygneus

Scientific classification
- Kingdom: Animalia
- Phylum: Mollusca
- Class: Gastropoda
- Subclass: Caenogastropoda
- Order: Neogastropoda
- Superfamily: Conoidea
- Family: Drilliidae
- Genus: Clavus
- Species: C. cygneus

Binomial name
- Clavus cygneus (Melvill & Standen, 1897)

Synonyms
- Clavus cygnea (Melvill & Standen, 1897); Drillia (Clavatula) nitens Brazier, 1876; Drillia cygnea Melvill & Standen, 1897

= Clavus cygneus =

Species of gastropod

Clavus cygnea is a species of sea snail, a marine gastropod mollusk in the family Drilliidae. This species is mentioned in the Indo-Pacific Molluscan Database as Clavus cygneus

== Description ==
The length of the shell attains 15 mm, its diameter 7 mm.

A pure white, shining, massive little shell with a fusiform shape and 6 - 7 whorls. It shows uniform straight longitudinal ribs. The surface is nearly smooth and shining. The ribs of the last three whorls are continuous, and about eight in number. The aperture is ovate. The siphonal canal is short.

== Distribution ==
This species is found in the demersal zone of tropical waters off Queensland (Australia) and New Caledonia.
