= Crassispira hispaniolae =

Scientific classification
- Kingdom: Animalia
- Phylum: Mollusca
- Class: Gastropoda
- Subclass: Caenogastropoda
- Order: Neogastropoda
- Superfamily: Conoidea
- Family: Pseudomelatomidae
- Genus: Crassispira
- Species: C. hispaniolae

Binomial name
- Crassispira hispaniolae (Maury 1917)

Synonyms
- † Crassispira (Crassispirella) hispaniolae (Maury 1917); † Drillia hispaniolae C.J. Maury, 1917

Extinct species of sea snail

Crassispira hispaniolae is an extinct species of sea snail, a marine gastropod mollusk in the family Pseudomelatomidae, the turrids and allies.

== Description ==
The length of the shell attains 9.5 mm, its diameter is 3.25 mm.

== Distribution ==
Fossils have been found in Pliocene strata of the Dominican Republic: age range: 5.332 to 3.6 Ma.
