= Crassispira tuckerana =

Scientific classification
- Kingdom: Animalia
- Phylum: Mollusca
- Class: Gastropoda
- Subclass: Caenogastropoda
- Order: Neogastropoda
- Superfamily: Conoidea
- Family: Pseudomelatomidae
- Genus: Crassispira
- Species: C. tuckerana

Binomial name
- Crassispira tuckerana Bonfitto & Morassi, 2004

Synonyms
- Crassispira (Crassispirella) tuckerana Bonfitto & Morassi, 2011; Crassispira tuckeri Bonfitto & Morassi, 2004 (Invalid: junior homonym of Crassispira tuckeri Le Renard, 1994; Crassispira tuckerana is a replacement name)

Species of gastropod

Crassispira tuckerana is a species of sea snail, a marine gastropod mollusk in the family Pseudomelatomidae.

== Distribution ==
This species is found in the Indian Ocean off Somalia.
