= Clathrodrillia dautzenbergi =

Scientific classification
- Kingdom: Animalia
- Phylum: Mollusca
- Class: Gastropoda
- Subclass: Caenogastropoda
- Order: Neogastropoda
- Superfamily: Conoidea
- Family: Drilliidae
- Genus: Clathrodrillia
- Species: C. dautzenbergi

Binomial name
- Clathrodrillia dautzenbergi (Tippett, 1995)

Synonyms
- Clathrodrillia minor (Dautzenberg, 1900); Clathrodrillia gibbosa minor (f) ,Dautzenberg Ph., 1900; Drillia (Clathrodrillia) dautzenbergi Tippett, 1995 (basionym); Drillia dautzenbergi Tippett, 1995 (original combination); Drillia gibbosa minor (f),Dautzenberg Ph., 1900 (invalid: junior homonym of Drillia minor Seguenza, 1880; Drillia dautzenbergi is a replacement name)

Species of gastropod

Clathrodrillia dautzenbergi is a species of sea snail, a marine gastropod mollusk in the family Drilliidae.

== Description ==
The size of an adult shell varies between 20 mm and 28 mm.

== Distribution ==
This species occurs off the Mid-Atlantic Ridge, in the Caribbean Sea, in the Atlantic Ocean off Eastern Brazil.
