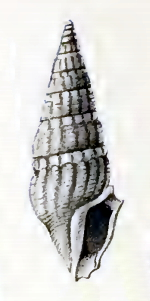
- Original image of a shell of Crassispira tasconium

Scientific classification
- Kingdom: Animalia
- Phylum: Mollusca
- Class: Gastropoda
- Subclass: Caenogastropoda
- Order: Neogastropoda
- Superfamily: Conoidea
- Family: Pseudomelatomidae
- Genus: Crassispira
- Species: C. tasconium

Binomial name
- Crassispira tasconium (Melvill & Standen, 1901)

Synonyms
- Drillia tasconium Melvill & Standen, 1901

= Crassispira tasconium =

Species of gastropod

Crassispira tasconium is a species of sea snail, a marine gastropod mollusk in the family Pseudomelatomidae.

== Description ==
The length of the shell attains 23 mm, its diameter 9.5 mm.

The fusiform shell is dark white or straw-colored. It contains 8–10 whorls (in the holotype the protoconch is lacking). The suture is profoundly impressed. The whole build of the shell is coarse, though of a light rather than massive consistency. Particularly conspicuous are the spiral sulci deeply furrowing the summit of each whorl, leaving a narrow noduled space between them and the sutures. The ovate aperture has a dark interior. The thin outer lip is slightly expanded. The sinus is wide and deep. The white columella is straight. The siphonal canal is short and straight.

== Distribution ==
This marine species occurs in the Gulf of Oman
