= Crassispira streptophora =

Scientific classification
- Kingdom: Animalia
- Phylum: Mollusca
- Class: Gastropoda
- Subclass: Caenogastropoda
- Order: Neogastropoda
- Superfamily: Conoidea
- Family: Pseudomelatomidae
- Genus: Crassispira
- Species: C. streptophora

Binomial name
- Crassispira streptophora (Bayan, 1873)

Synonyms
- † Drillia streptophora (Bayan, 1873); † Pleurotoma (Surcula) streptophora Bayan, 1873 (original combination)

Extinct species of gastropod

Crassispira raricostulata is an extinct species of sea snail, a marine gastropod mollusk in the family Pseudomelatomidae, the turrids and allies.

== Distribution ==
Fossils have been found in Eocene strata in Picardy, France.
