= Crassispira losquemadica =

Scientific classification
- Kingdom: Animalia
- Phylum: Mollusca
- Class: Gastropoda
- Subclass: Caenogastropoda
- Order: Neogastropoda
- Superfamily: Conoidea
- Family: Pseudomelatomidae
- Genus: Crassispira
- Species: C. losquemadica

Binomial name
- Crassispira losquemadica (Maury, 1917)

Synonyms
- † Drillia losquemadica Maury, 1917

Extinct species of gastropod

Crassispira losquemadica is an extinct species of sea snail, a marine gastropod mollusk in the family Pseudomelatomidae, the turrids and allies. Fossils have been found in Pliocene and Miocene strata in the Dominican Republic; age range: 5.332 to 3.6 Ma.
