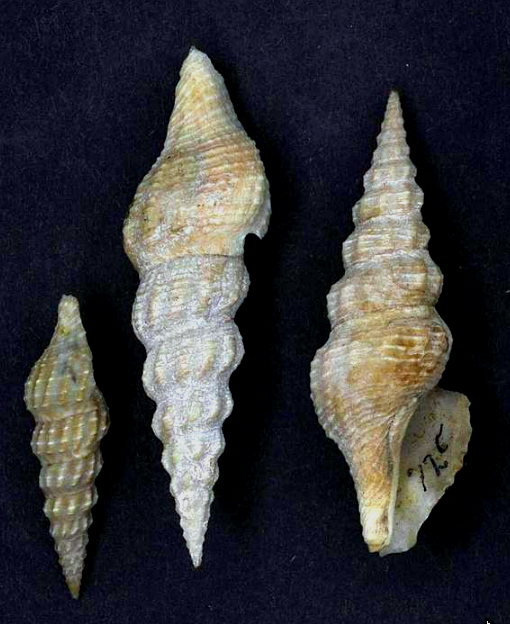
- Shells of Clathrodrillia flavidula (museum specimens at Naturalis Biodiversity Center)

Scientific classification
- Kingdom: Animalia
- Phylum: Mollusca
- Class: Gastropoda
- Subclass: Caenogastropoda
- Order: Neogastropoda
- Superfamily: Conoidea
- Family: Drilliidae
- Genus: Clathrodrillia; Dall, 1918

Type species
- Murex gibbosus Born, 1778

Species
- See text

Synonyms
- Clavus (Clathrodrillia) Dall, 1918; Drillia (Clathrodrillia) Dall, 1918

= Clathrodrillia =

Genus of gastropods

Clathrodrillia is a genus of sea snails, marine gastropod mollusks in the family Drilliidae.

== Description ==
Previously this genus was regarded as a subgenus of Drillia. It differs by its stronger spiral sculpture. The terminal varix, blotched with color, is also more pronounced. These are brown or brownish clathrate species.

== Species ==
Species within the genus Clathrodrillia include:

- Clathrodrillia allyniana (Hertlein & Strong, 1951).
- Clathrodrillia berryi (McLean & Poorman, 1971).
- Clathrodrillia callianira Dall, 1919.
- Clathrodrillia colombiana Fallon, 2016.
- Clathrodrillia dautzenbergi (Tippett, 1995).
- Clathrodrillia dolana Dall, 1927.
- Clathrodrillia flavidula (Lamarck, 1822).
- Clathrodrillia garciai Fallon, 2016.
- Clathrodrillia gibbosa (Born, 1778).
- Clathrodrillia guadeloupensis Fallon, 2016.
- Clathrodrillia inimica Dall, 1927.
- † Clathrodrillia kutaiana Beets, 1985
- Clathrodrillia lophoessa (Watson, 1882).
- Clathrodrillia marissae Fallon, 2016.
- Clathrodrillia orellana Dall, 1927.
- Clathrodrillia parva Fallon, 2016.
- Clathrodrillia petuchi (Tippett, 1995).
- Clathrodrillia rubrofasciata Fallon, 2016.
- Clathrodrillia salvadorica (Hertlein & Strong, 1951).
- Clathrodrillia solida (Adams C. B., 1850).
- Clathrodrillia tryoni (Dall, 1889).
- Clathrodrillia vezzaronellyae Cossignani, 2019
- Clathrodrillia walteri (Smith M., 1946).
- Clathrodrillia wolfei (Tippett, 1995).

Species brought into synonymy

- Clathrodrillia aenone (Dall, 1919): synonym of Pyrgospira obeliscus (Reeve, 1845).
- Clathrodrillia albicoma (Dall, 1889): synonym of Neodrillia albicoma (Dall, 1889).
- Clathrodrillia albinodata auct. non Reeve, 1846: synonym of Pilsbryspira nodata (C. B. Adams, 1850).
- Clathrodrillia alcestis Dall, 1919: synonym of Compsodrillia alcestis (Dall, 1919)
- Clathrodrillia alcmene Dall, 1919: synonym of Calliclava alcmene (Dall, 1919)
- Clathrodrillia alcyone Dall, 1919: synonym of Kylix alcyone (Dall, 1919)
- Clathrodrillia andromeda Dall, 1919: synonym of Hindsiclava andromeda (Dall, 1919)
- Clathrodrillia bicarinata Shasky, 1961 synonym of Compsodrillia bicarinata (Shasky, 1961)
- Clathrodrillia blakensis (Tippett, 2007): synonym of Neodrillia blakensis (Tippett, 2007)
- Clathrodrillia castianira Dall, 1919: synonym of Crockerella castianira (Dall, 1919)
- Clathrodrillia chaaci (Espinosa & Rolan, 1995): synonym of Fenimorea chaaci (Espinosa & Rolán, 1995)
- Clathrodrillia connelli (Kilburn, 1988): synonym of Drillia connelli Kilburn, 1988
- Clathrodrillia fanoa Dall, 1927: synonym of Compsodrillia fanoa (Dall, 1927)
- Clathrodrillia fuscescens Reeve, 1843: synonym of Crassispira fuscescens (Reeve, 1843)
- Clathrodrillia haliplexa Dall, 1919: synonym of Compsodrillia haliplexa (Dall, 1919)
- Clathrodrillia halis Dall, 1919: synonym of Carinodrillia halis (Dall, 1919)
- Clathrodrillia interpleura (Dall & Simpson, 1901): synonym of Buchema interpleura (Dall & Simpson, 1901)
- Clathrodrillia limans Dall, 1919: synonym of Crassispira pellisphocae (Reeve, 1845)
- † Clathrodrillia mareana Weisbord, 1962: synonym of Clathrodrillia gibbosa (Born, 1778)
- Clathrodrillia minor (Dautzenberg, 1900): synonym of Clathrodrillia dautzenbergi (Tippett, 1995)
- Clathrodrillia ostrearum Stearns, 1872: synonym of Pyrgospira ostrearum (Stearns, 1872)
- Clathrodrillia paria (Reeve, 1846): synonym of Fenimorea paria (Reeve, 1846)
- Clathrodrillia paziana Dall, 1919: synonym of Kylix paziana (Dall, 1919)
- Clathrodrillia pentagonalis Dall, 1889: synonym of Bellaspira pentagonalis (Dall, 1889)
- Clathodrillia perclathrata (Azuma, 1960): synonym of Clavus (Clathrodrillia) perclathrata Azuma, 1960 (nomen nudum)
- Clathrodrillia ponciana (Dall & Simpson, 1901): synonym of Crassispira nigrescens (C. B. Adams, 1845)
- Clathrodrillia resina (Dall, 1908): synonym of Hindsiclava resina (Dall, 1908)
- Clathrodrillia thestia Dall, 1919: synonym of Compsodrillia thestia (Dall, 1919)
- Clathrodrillia tholoides Watson, 1882: synonym of Kryptos tholoides (Watson, 1882)
