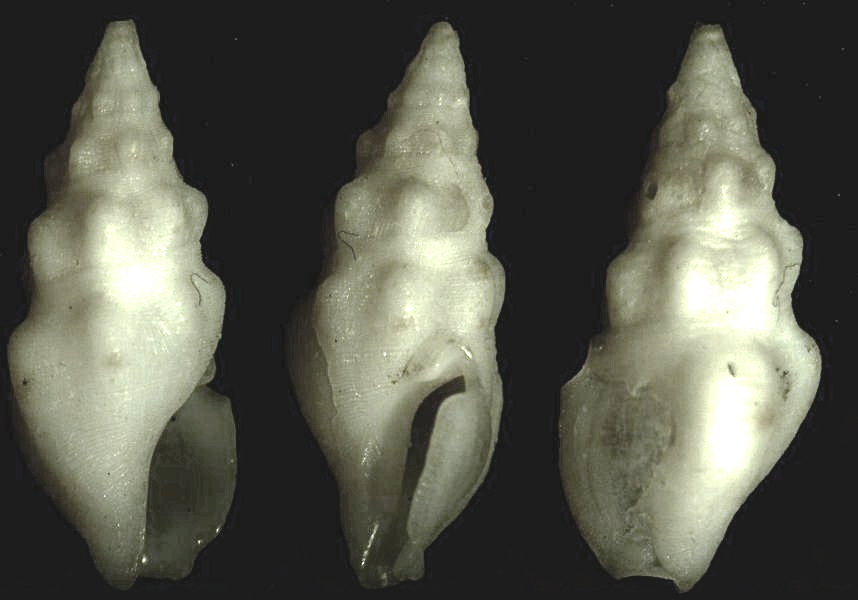
- Three views of a shell of Neodrillia cydia

Scientific classification
- Kingdom: Animalia
- Phylum: Mollusca
- Class: Gastropoda
- Subclass: Caenogastropoda
- Order: Neogastropoda
- Superfamily: Conoidea
- Family: Drilliidae
- Genus: Neodrillia; Bartsch, 1943

Type species
- Neodrillia cydia Bartsch, 1943

Species
- See text

= Neodrillia =

Genus of gastropods

Neodrillia is a genus of sea snails, marine gastropod mollusks in the family Drilliidae.

== Species ==
Species within the genus Neodrillia include:

- Neodrillia albicoma (Dall, 1889)
- Neodrillia blakensis (Tippett, 2007)
- Neodrillia crassa Fallon, 2016
- Neodrillia cydia Bartsch, 1943
- Neodrillia princeps Fallon, 2016

Species brought into synonymy

- Neodrillia antiguensis Bartsch, 1943: synonym of Neodrillia cydia Bartsch, 1943
- Neodrillia barbadensis Bartsch, 1943: synonym of Neodrillia cydia Bartsch, 1943
- Neodrillia blacki Petuch, 2003: synonym of Fenimorea moseri (Dall, 1889)
- Neodrillia encia Bartsch, 1943: synonym of Neodrillia cydia Bartsch, 1943
- Neodrillia euphanes (J.C. Melvill, 1923): synonym of Drillia euphanes J.C. Melvill, 1923
- Neodrillia jamaicensis Bartsch, 1943: synonym of Neodrillia cydia Bartsch, 1943
