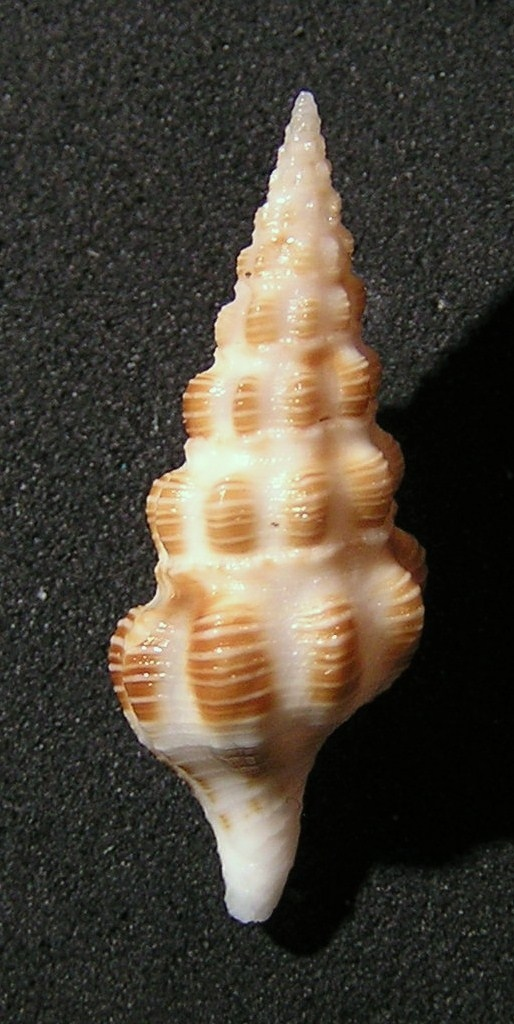
- Abapertural view of a shell of Fenimorea janetae

Scientific classification
- Kingdom: Animalia
- Phylum: Mollusca
- Class: Gastropoda
- Subclass: Caenogastropoda
- Order: Neogastropoda
- Superfamily: Conoidea
- Family: Drilliidae
- Genus: Fenimorea; Bartsch, 1934

Type species
- Fenimorea janetae Bartsch, 1934

Species
- See text

= Fenimorea =

Genus of gastropods

Fenimorea is a genus of carnivorous sea snails, marine gastropod mollusks in the family Drilliidae.

== Description ==
(Original description) The shell is large. The whorls of the protoconch are well rounded and smooth. The whorls of the spire show strong, broad axial ribs that are retractively bent and reduced in the depressed groove below the summit and extend anteriorly to the fasciole on the base. The finer sculpture on the ribs and intercostal spaces consists of decidedly wavy incised spiral lines and fine incremental lines, which vary in strength. The combination of these two elements gives to the surface a peculiar effect, resembling the scales on some butterfly wings. This sculpture extends to the basal fasciole. The fasciole itself and the area immediately posterior to it, as well as the rest of the columella, are marked by spiral threads. The aperture is moderately long and broad and strongly channeled anteriorly. The basal sinus is deep and reflected at the edge with a strong parietal callus. The stromboid notch is shallow.

== Species ==
Species within the genus Fenimorea include:

- Fenimorea abscondita Fallon, 2016
- Fenimorea alba Fallon, 2016
- Fenimorea biminensis Fallon, 2016
- Fenimorea caysalensis Fallon, 2016
- Fenimorea chaaci (Espinosa & Rolán, 1995)
- Fenimorea contracta Fallon, 2016
- Fenimorea crocea Fallon, 2016
- Fenimorea culexensis Nowell-Usticke, 1969
- Fenimorea elongata Fallon, 2016
- Fenimorea fabae Fallon, 2016
- Fenimorea fucata (Reeve, 1845)
- Fenimorea glennduffyi Fallon, 2016
- Fenimorea janetae Bartsch, 1934
- Fenimorea jongreenlawi Fallon, 2016
- Fenimorea kathyae Tippett, 1995
- Fenimorea mackintoshi Fallon, 2016
- Fenimorea marmarina (Watson, 1881)
- Fenimorea moseri (Dall, 1889)
- Fenimorea nivalis Fallon, 2016
- Fenimorea pagodula (Dall, 1889)
- Fenimorea petiti Tippett, 1995
- Fenimorea phasma (Schwengel, 1940)
- Fenimorea sunderlandi (Petuch, 1987)
- Fenimorea tartaneata Fallon, 2016
- Fenimorea tessellata Fallon, 2016
- Fenimorea tippetti Fallon, 2016

Species brought into synonymy

- Fenimorea brunnescens Rehder, 1943: synonym of Bellaspira brunnescens (Rehder, 1943)
- Fenimorea halidorema Schwengel, 1940: synonym of Decoradrillia pulchella (Reeve, 1845)
- Fenimorea pentapleura J.S. Schwengel, 1940: synonym of Bellaspira pentagonalis (W.H. Dall, 1889)
- Fenimorea pulchra G.W. Nowell-Usticke, 1959 : synonym of Fenimorea fucata (Reeve, 1845)
- Fenimorea ustickei (Nowell-Usticke, 1959): synonym of Neodrillia cydia Bartsch, 1943

Nomen dubium

- Fenimorea paria (Reeve, 1846)
