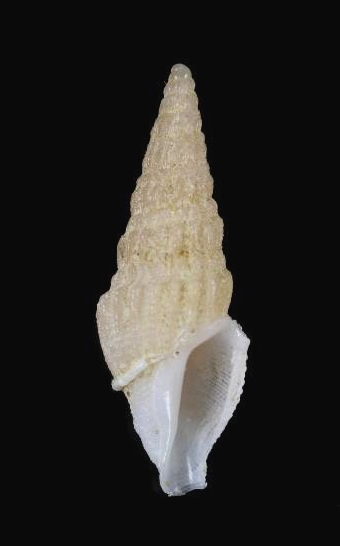
- Shell of Clathrodrillia tryoni (specimen at MNHN, Paris)

Scientific classification
- Kingdom: Animalia
- Phylum: Mollusca
- Class: Gastropoda
- Subclass: Caenogastropoda
- Order: Neogastropoda
- Superfamily: Conoidea
- Family: Drilliidae
- Genus: Clathrodrillia
- Species: C. tryoni

Binomial name
- Clathrodrillia tryoni (Dall, 1889)

Synonyms
- Drillia tryonii Dall, 1889 (original combination)

= Clathrodrillia tryoni =

Species of gastropod

Clathrodrillia tryoni is a species of sea snail, a marine gastropod mollusk in the family Drilliidae.

== Description ==
The length of the shell varies between 8 mm and 18 mm.

(Original description) The appearance of the shell recalls Pyrgospira ostrearum (Stearns, 1872), but it is white, more acutely pointed, smaller, with a more gibbous varix in the adult, an umbilical chink on the columella, and a spirally threaded fasciole instead of a smooth one. The shell contains 8 moderately rounded whorls and a smooth protoconch. The sculpture shows 16–18 long transverse ribs extending across the whorls, fasciole and all. These are crossed by numerous (eleven on the last whorl but one) elevated, even, rounded threads, with about equal or wider interspaces. The threads are not swollen at the intersections. The suture is distinct. The fasciole but slightly excavated. On the body whorl, a quarter of a turn before the adult aperture is formed, is a prominent swollen rounded varix, or rib. The aperture is short. The body is callous. The columella is reflected, forming a distinct pseudo-umbilicus. The outer lip is thin, not lirate, and strongly arched. The short siphonal canal is curved.

== Distribution ==
This marine species occurs in the Caribbean Sea and in the Lesser Antilles (Barbados, Guadeloupe, Grenada and Saint Vincent and the Grenadines.
