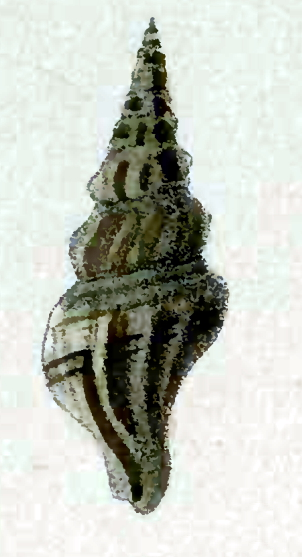
- Drawing of a shell of Inquisitor zonata

Scientific classification
- Kingdom: Animalia
- Phylum: Mollusca
- Class: Gastropoda
- Subclass: Caenogastropoda
- Order: Neogastropoda
- Superfamily: Conoidea
- Family: Pseudomelatomidae
- Genus: Inquisitor
- Species: I. zonata

Binomial name
- Inquisitor zonata (Reeve, 1843)

Synonyms
- Drillia zonata (Reeve, 1843); Pleurotoma zonata Reeve, 1843

= Inquisitor zonata =

Species of gastropod

Inquisitor zonata is a species of sea snail, a marine gastropod mollusk in the family Pseudomelatomidae, the turrids and allies.

G.W. Tryon considered this species to be a synonym of Clathrodrillia flavidula (Lamarck, 1822)

== Distribution ==
This marine species occurs off Singapore and in the China Seas.
