= C. nigrescens =

C. nigrescens may refer to:

- Calliophis nigrescens, the black coral snake, a venomous snake species found in the Western Ghats of India
- Crassispira nigrescens, a sea snail species
- Cryptotis nigrescens, the blackish small-eared shrew, a mammal species found in parts of Costa Rica, El Salvador, Guatemala, Honduras, Mexico and Panama

== Synonyms ==
- Commiphora nigrescens, a synonym for Commiphora angolensis, a shrub species found in Angola
