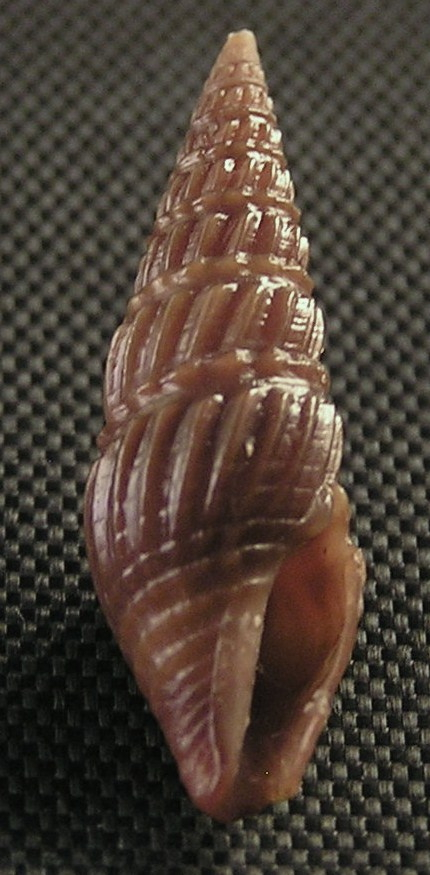
- Apertural view of a shell of Crassispira harpularia

Scientific classification
- Kingdom: Animalia
- Phylum: Mollusca
- Class: Gastropoda
- Subclass: Caenogastropoda
- Order: Neogastropoda
- Superfamily: Conoidea
- Family: Pseudomelatomidae
- Genus: Crassispira
- Species: C. harpularia

Binomial name
- Crassispira harpularia (Desmoulins, 1842)

Synonyms
- Crassispira harpula Menke, 1853; Drillia harpularia Angas, 1865; Melatomia harpularia (Desmoulins, 1842); Pleurotoma harpula Kiener, L.C., 1840; Pleurotoma harpularia Desmoulins, 1842; Pleurotoma (Crassispira) harpularia Desmoulins, 1842

= Crassispira harpularia =

Species of gastropod

Crassispira harpularia is a species of sea snail, a marine gastropod mollusk in the family Pseudomelatomidae.

== Description ==
The shell has a chestnut- or chocolate color. The spire is more slenderly elongated. The siphonal canal is 'longer and more compressed than in Clathrodrillia solida (C. B. Adams, 1850). The revolving lines do not form granules on the ribs.

== Distribution ==
This marine species is endemic to Australia and occurs off South Australia, Tasmania, Victoria and Western Australia.
