= Crockerella hesione =

Scientific classification
- Kingdom: Animalia
- Phylum: Mollusca
- Class: Gastropoda
- Subclass: Caenogastropoda
- Order: Neogastropoda
- Superfamily: Conoidea
- Family: Clathurellidae
- Genus: Crockerella
- Species: C. hesione

Binomial name
- Crockerella hesione (Dall, 1919)

Synonyms
- Philbertia hesione Dall, 1919

Species of gastropod

Crockerella hesione is a species of sea snail, a marine gastropod mollusk in the family Clathurellidae, the cone snails and their allies.
