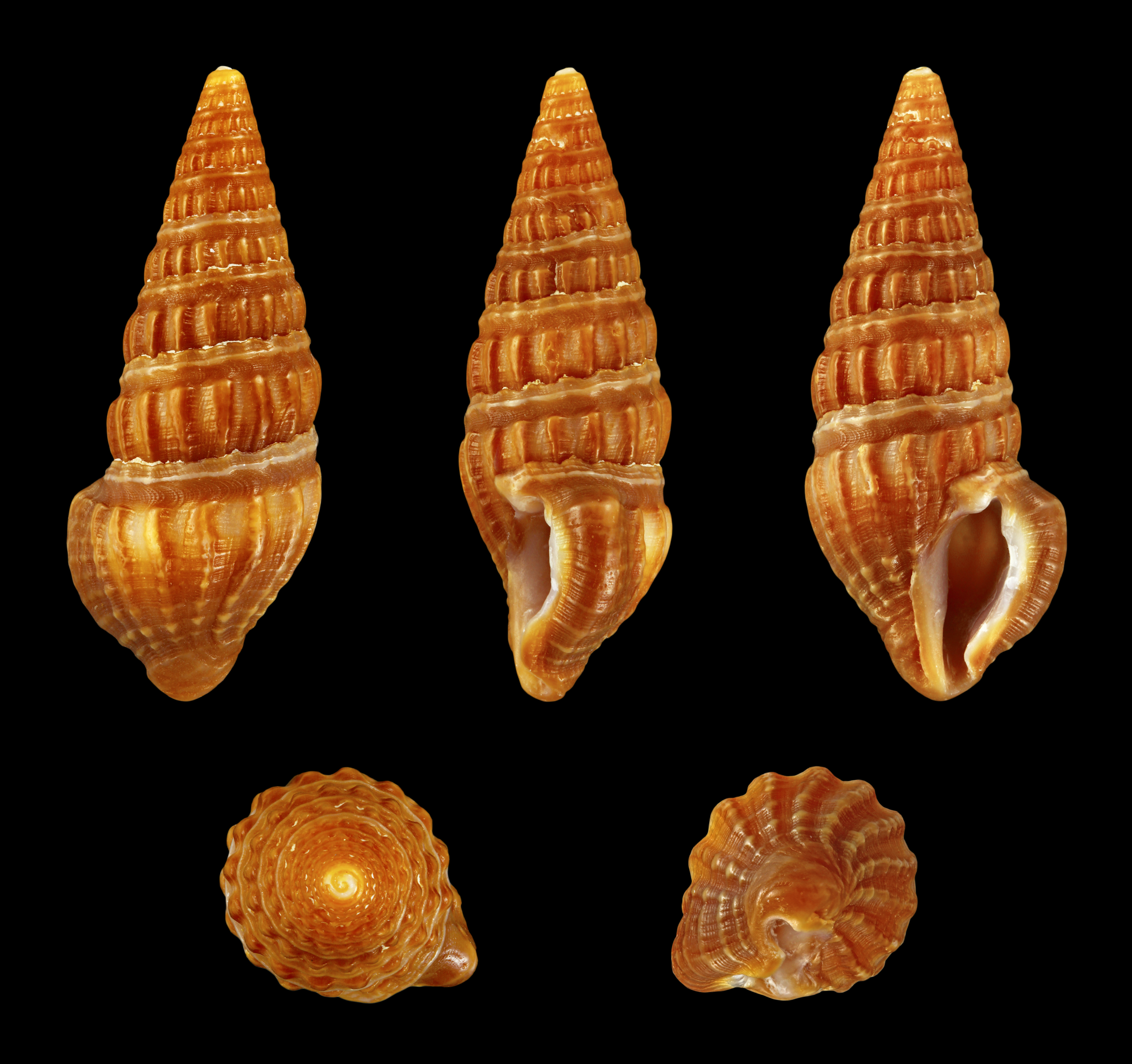
- Pyrgospira tampaensis

Scientific classification
- Kingdom: Animalia
- Phylum: Mollusca
- Class: Gastropoda
- Subclass: Caenogastropoda
- Order: Neogastropoda
- Superfamily: Conoidea
- Family: Pseudomelatomidae
- Genus: Pyrgospira; McLean, 1971

Type species
- Pleurotoma obeliscus Reeve, 1845

Species
- See text

= Pyrgospira =

Genus of gastropods

Pyrgospira is a genus of sea snails, marine gastropod mollusks in the family Pseudomelatomidae, the turrids and allies

== Species ==
Species within the genus Pyrgospira include:

- Pyrgospira aenone Dall, 1919
- Pyrgospira candace (Dall, 1919)
- Pyrgospira ostrearum (Stearns, 1872)
- Pyrgospira tampaensis (Bartsch & Rehder, 1939)

Species brought into synonymy

- † Pyrgospira acurugata Dall, 1890: synonym of † Strictispira acurugata (Dall, 1890)
- Pyrgospira fuscescens (Reeve, 1843): synonym of Crassispira fuscescens (Reeve, 1843)
- Pyrgospira nautica Pilsbry & Lowe, 1932: synonym of Pyrgospira aenone (Dall, 1919)
- Pyrgospira obeliscus (Reeve, 1845): synonym of Pyrgospira aenone (Dall, 1919)
- Pyrgospira plicosa (Adams C. B., 1850): synonym of Pyrgocythara plicosa (C. B. Adams, 1850)
- Pyrgospira tomliniana Melvill, 1927 : synonym of Pyrgospira aenone (Dall, 1919)
