= Fenimorea tartaneata =

Scientific classification
- Kingdom: Animalia
- Phylum: Mollusca
- Class: Gastropoda
- Subclass: Caenogastropoda
- Order: Neogastropoda
- Superfamily: Conoidea
- Family: Drilliidae
- Genus: Fenimorea
- Species: F. tartaneata

Binomial name
- Fenimorea tartaneata Fallon, 2016

Species of gastropod

Fenimorea tartaneata is a species of sea snail, a marine gastropod mollusc in the family Drilliidae. The species was described by Phillip J. Fallon in 2016 during a taxonomic review of shallow-water tropical western Atlantic Drilliidae.

== Taxonomy ==
Phillip J. Fallon described F. tartaneata as a new species in 2016. The description was published in a Zootaxa monograph that reviewed shallow-water, tropical western Atlantic Drilliidae and described 100 new species based on the examination of more than 3,200 specimens from museum and private collections. Plazi TreatmentBank places the treatment of F. tartaneata on pages 204–205 of Fallon's monograph. MolluscaBase and the World Register of Marine Species treat Fenimorea tartaneata as an accepted name and assign it AphiaID 872032.

== Description ==
Fenimorea tartaneata has a medium-sized shell, with reported specimens reaching about 29 mm in total length. The shell is comparatively broad for the genus, with a relatively broad spire and deep spiral grooves. Its central colour band is patterned rather than solid, a character used to separate it from the related species Fenimorea janetae.

In comparative notes, Fallon treated F. tartaneata as similar in general appearance to Fenimorea chaaci, with both species having a broadly fusiform, squat shell profile and numerous ribs, but differing in shell form, sculpture and colour pattern.

== Distribution and habitat ==
This marine species is known only from Honduras, in the western Caribbean Sea. The type locality is Trujillo Bay, Honduras, at about 15°57′57″N 086°01′44″W, where specimens were reported from a depth of 20 m on soft sand.
