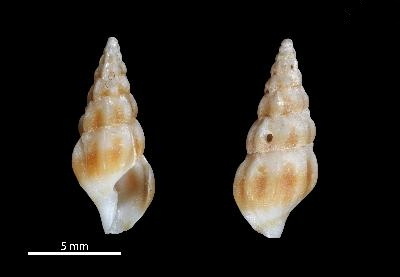
- Shell of Fenimorea petiti (paratype at MNHN, Paris)

Scientific classification
- Kingdom: Animalia
- Phylum: Mollusca
- Class: Gastropoda
- Subclass: Caenogastropoda
- Order: Neogastropoda
- Superfamily: Conoidea
- Family: Drilliidae
- Genus: Fenimorea
- Species: F. petiti

Binomial name
- Fenimorea petiti Tippett, 1995

Synonyms
- Splendrillia petiti (Tippett, D.L., 1995)

= Fenimorea petiti =

Species of gastropod

Fenimorea petiti is a species of sea snail, a marine gastropod mollusk in the family Drilliidae.

== Description ==
The shell grows to a length of 18 mm.

== Distribution ==
This species occurs in the demersal zone of the Gulf of Mexico (Florida) at a depths of 59 m.
