= Fenimorea sunderlandi =

Scientific classification
- Kingdom: Animalia
- Phylum: Mollusca
- Class: Gastropoda
- Subclass: Caenogastropoda
- Order: Neogastropoda
- Superfamily: Conoidea
- Family: Drilliidae
- Genus: Fenimorea
- Species: F. sunderlandi

Binomial name
- Fenimorea sunderlandi (Petuch, 1987)

Synonyms
- Splendrillia sunderlandi Petuch, 1987 (basionym)

Species of gastropod

Fenimorea sunderlandi is a species of sea snail, a marine gastropod mollusk in the family Drilliidae.

== Description ==
Original description: "Shell large for genus, elongated; body whorl and spire whorls rounded, without obvious shoulder; shell smooth, silky, without spiral grooves, threads, or other sculpture; body whorl with large, wide, swollen axial hump that is roughly 3 ribs in width; columella wide, well-developed; shell color pure white with single, wide, wine red band around mid-body; spire whorls with red band running along suture; interior of aperture white, with red band showing through from exterior."

The size of an adult shell varies between 20 mm and 40 mm.

== Distribution ==
Locus typicus: "(Dredged from) 150 metres depth 50 kilometres South of Apalachicola, Florida, USA."

This species occurs in the demersal zone of the Gulf of Mexico;

in the Atlantic Ocean between Florida and Brazil at depths between 61 m and 150 m.
