= Clathrodrillia berryi =

Scientific classification
- Kingdom: Animalia
- Phylum: Mollusca
- Class: Gastropoda
- Subclass: Caenogastropoda
- Order: Neogastropoda
- Superfamily: Conoidea
- Family: Drilliidae
- Genus: Clathrodrillia
- Species: C. berryi

Binomial name
- Clathrodrillia berryi (McLean & Poorman, 1971)

Synonyms
- Drillia berryi McLean & Poorman, 1971

Species of gastropod

Clathrodrillia berryi is a species of sea snail, a marine gastropod mollusk in the family Drilliidae.

== Distribution ==
This species occurs in the Pacific Ocean along Panama.
