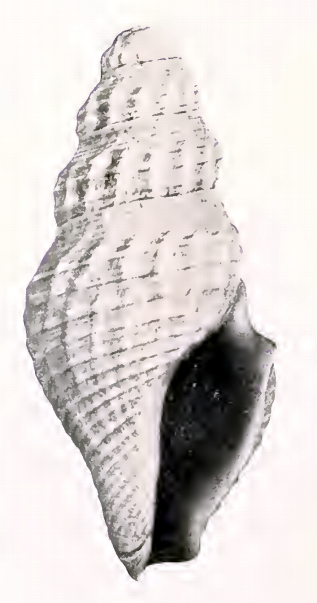
- Shell of Crockerella philodice

Scientific classification
- Kingdom: Animalia
- Phylum: Mollusca
- Class: Gastropoda
- Subclass: Caenogastropoda
- Order: Neogastropoda
- Superfamily: Conoidea
- Family: Clathurellidae
- Genus: Crockerella; Hertlein & Strong, 1951

Type species
- Clathurella crystallina Gabb, 1865

Species
- See text

= Crockerella =

Genus of gastropods

Crockerella is a genus of sea snails, marine gastropod mollusks in the family Clathurellidae.

== Species ==
Species within the genus Crockerella include:

- Crockerella castianira (Dall, 1919)
- Crockerella conradiana (Gabb, 1869)
- Crockerella constricta (Gabb, 1865)
- Crockerella crystallina (Gabb, 1865)
- Crockerella cymodoce (Dall, 1919)
- Crockerella eriphyle (Dall, 1919)
- Crockerella evadne (Dall, 1919)
- Crockerella lowei (Dall, 1903)
- Crockerella philodice (Dall, 1919)
- Crockerella scotti McLean, 1996
- Crockerella toreumata (Dall, W.H., 1889)
- Crockerella tridesmia (Berry, 1941)

Species brought into synonymy

- Crockerella hesione (Dall, 1919): synonym of Crockerella lowei (Dall, 1903)
- Crockerella pederseni Hertlein, L.G. & A.M. Strong, 1951: synonym of Pyrgocythara danae (Dall, 1919)
- Crockerella philodoce (Dall, 1919): synonym of Crockerella philodice (Dall, 1919)
