= Fenimorea alba =

Scientific classification
- Kingdom: Animalia
- Phylum: Mollusca
- Class: Gastropoda
- Subclass: Caenogastropoda
- Order: Neogastropoda
- Superfamily: Conoidea
- Family: Drilliidae
- Genus: Fenimorea
- Species: F. alba

Binomial name
- Fenimorea alba Fallon, 2016

Species of gastropod

Fenimorea alba is a species of sea snail, a marine gastropod mollusc in the family Drilliidae. The superfamily of a Fenimorea alba is Conoidea.

== Description ==
The length of this marine shell varies between 14 mm and 22 mm.

== Distribution ==
This marine species occurs in the Caribbean Sea off the coast of Panama.
