= Clathrodrillia salvadorica =

Scientific classification
- Kingdom: Animalia
- Phylum: Mollusca
- Class: Gastropoda
- Subclass: Caenogastropoda
- Order: Neogastropoda
- Superfamily: Conoidea
- Family: Drilliidae
- Genus: Clathrodrillia
- Species: C. salvadorica

Binomial name
- Clathrodrillia salvadorica (Hertlein & Strong, 1951)

Synonyms
- Drillia salvadorica (Hertlein & Strong, 1951); Elaeocyma salvadorica Hertlein & Strong, 1951

Species of gastropod

Clathrodrillia salvadorica is a species of sea snail, a marine gastropod mollusk in the family Drilliidae.

== Description ==
The size of an adult shell varies between 20 mm and 30 mm.

== Distribution ==
This marine species occurs between the Gulf of California and El Salvador.
