= Clathrodrillia dolana =

Scientific classification
- Kingdom: Animalia
- Phylum: Mollusca
- Class: Gastropoda
- Subclass: Caenogastropoda
- Order: Neogastropoda
- Superfamily: Conoidea
- Family: Drilliidae
- Genus: Clathrodrillia
- Species: C. dolana

Binomial name
- Clathrodrillia dolana Dall, 1927

Species of gastropod

Clathrodrillia dolana is a species of sea snail, a marine gastropod mollusk in the family Drilliidae.

== Description ==
The shell grows to a length of 6.5 mm, its diameter 2.5 mm.

(Original description) The small shell is whitish. It has a smooth protoconch containing 1½ whorls. The five subsequent whorls are moderately rounded. The suture is distinct and hardly appressed. The anal fasciole is nearly smooth and hardly concave. The axial sculpture consists of (on the body whorl about 16, exclusive of the varix) narrow, small, very flexuous ribs, sometimes a little angular in front of the fasciole, with equal or narrower interspaces obsolete on the base. The spiral sculpture consists of (between the sutures 3) fine conspicuous threads with wider interspaces, overriding the ribs. On the base of the shell and on the siphonal canal these number about 10 more diminishing forward. The aperture is a little wider than the siphonal canal. The anal sulcus is shallow and rounded. The outer lip is thin, not inflected, protractively flexuous. The columella is short and attenuated in front. The siphonal canal is shorty wide.

== Distribution ==
This species occurs in the Atlantic Ocean off Georgia to Florida.
