= Fenimorea mackintoshi =

Scientific classification
- Kingdom: Animalia
- Phylum: Mollusca
- Class: Gastropoda
- Subclass: Caenogastropoda
- Order: Neogastropoda
- Superfamily: Conoidea
- Family: Drilliidae
- Genus: Fenimorea
- Species: F. mackintoshi

Binomial name
- Fenimorea mackintoshi Fallon, 2016

Species of gastropod

Fenimorea mackintoshi is a species of sea snail, a marine gastropod mollusc in the family Drilliidae.

== Description ==
The length of this marine shell varies between 12 mm and 15.5 mm. The shape is fusiform and has approximately 9 whorls, with the bottom whorl consisting of over half of the shell's height. The color is an uneven brown with a white apex whorl, anterior fasciole, and distal end of anterior canal.

== Distribution ==
This marine species occurs off the Bahamas.
