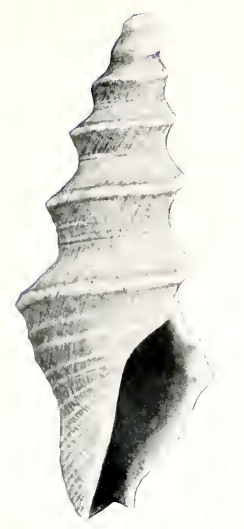
- Original image of a shell of Crockerella evadne

Scientific classification
- Kingdom: Animalia
- Phylum: Mollusca
- Class: Gastropoda
- Subclass: Caenogastropoda
- Order: Neogastropoda
- Superfamily: Conoidea
- Family: Clathurellidae
- Genus: Crockerella
- Species: C. evadne

Binomial name
- Crockerella evadne (W.H. Dall, 1919)

Synonyms
- Mangilia evadne W.H. Dall, 1919

= Crockerella evadne =

Species of gastropod

Crockerella evadne is a species of sea snail, a marine gastropod mollusk in the family Clathurellidae.

== Description ==
The length of the shell attains 12 mm, its diameter 3 mm.

(Original description) The small, white shell is, slender. It has a smooth swollen protoconch of 1½ whorls and five subsequent whorls. The suture is constricted, distinct, not appressed. The whorls slope flatly toward it on both sides. The axial sculpture consists only of faint incremental lines. The spiral sculpture consists of one very prominent keel at the shoulder with one smaller and several still finer threads behind it. The anal fasciole is smooth. On the body whorl there are two major threads with much wider interspaces, in front of them about six smaller closer threads to the siphonal canal which has about six close-set threads and a marked siphonal fasciole. The aperture is rather narrow. The anal sulcus is deep, rounded, separated by a single thread from the suture. The outer lip is thin, produced and sharp. The inner lip is erased. The columella is straight. The siphonal canal is distinct, rather wide and recurved.

== Distribution ==
This marine species was found off Santa Rosa Island, California, USA.
