= Fenimorea abscondita =

Scientific classification
- Kingdom: Animalia
- Phylum: Mollusca
- Class: Gastropoda
- Subclass: Caenogastropoda
- Order: Neogastropoda
- Superfamily: Conoidea
- Family: Drilliidae
- Genus: Fenimorea
- Species: F. abscondita

Binomial name
- Fenimorea abscondita Fallon, 2016

Species of gastropod

Fenimorea abscondita is a species of sea snail, a marine gastropod mollusc in the family Drilliidae.

== Description ==
The length of this marine shell varies between 20 mm and 36 mm. The shell is fusiform, anteriorly truncated and has a glossy surface with a high spire.

== Distribution ==
This marine species occurs off west Florida, Usa off the shores of Levy, Pinellas, Hillsborough, Naples, Collier and in the gulf of mexico at depths of 150 ft (46 m).

== Etymology ==
Fenimorea absconditus comes from the Latin adjective "absconditus".
