= Fenimorea culexensis =

Scientific classification
- Kingdom: Animalia
- Phylum: Mollusca
- Class: Gastropoda
- Subclass: Caenogastropoda
- Order: Neogastropoda
- Superfamily: Conoidea
- Family: Drilliidae
- Genus: Fenimorea
- Species: F. culexensis

Binomial name
- Fenimorea culexensis Nowell-Usticke, 1969

Species of gastropod

Fenimorea culexensis is a species of sea snail, a marine gastropod mollusc in the family Drilliidae.

== Description ==
The shell grows to a length of 15 mm.

== Distribution ==
This species occurs in the demersal zone of the Caribbean Sea, the Lesser Antilles, and Puerto Rico.
