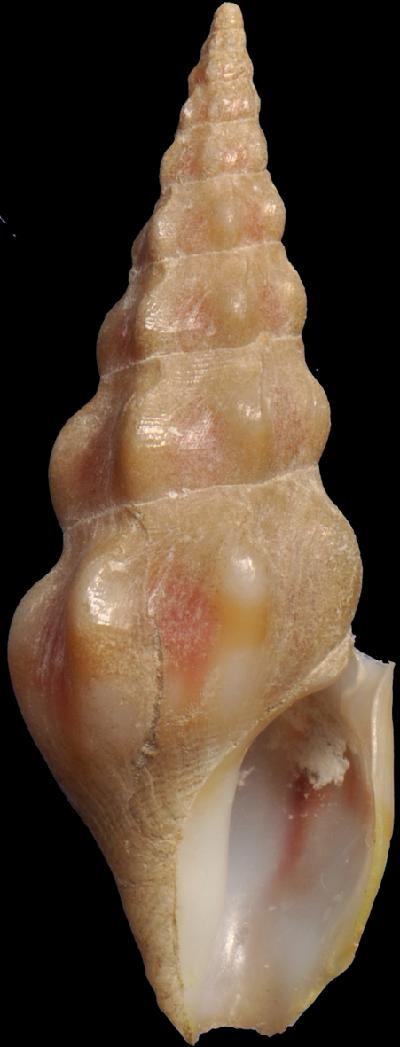
- Shell of Fenimorea kathyae (specimen at MNHN, Paris)

Scientific classification
- Kingdom: Animalia
- Phylum: Mollusca
- Class: Gastropoda
- Subclass: Caenogastropoda
- Order: Neogastropoda
- Superfamily: Conoidea
- Family: Drilliidae
- Genus: Fenimorea
- Species: F. kathyae

Binomial name
- Fenimorea kathyae Tippett, 1995

Synonyms
- Splendrillia kathyae Turgeon et al., 1998

= Fenimorea kathyae =

Species of gastropod

Fenimorea kathyae is a species of sea snail, a marine gastropod mollusk in the family Drilliidae.

== Description ==
The shell grows to a length of 36 mm.

== Distribution ==
This species occurs in the demersal zone of the Gulf of Mexico; and off Barbados and Guadeloupe at depths between 58 m and 152 m.
