= Fenimorea phasma =

Scientific classification
- Kingdom: Animalia
- Phylum: Mollusca
- Class: Gastropoda
- Subclass: Caenogastropoda
- Order: Neogastropoda
- Superfamily: Conoidea
- Family: Drilliidae
- Genus: Fenimorea
- Species: F. phasma

Binomial name
- Fenimorea phasma (Schwengel, 1940)

Synonyms
- Crassispira phasma Schwengel, 1940 (original combination)

Species of gastropod

Fenimorea phasma is a species of sea snail, a marine gastropod mollusk in the family Drilliidae.

== Description ==
The length of this marine shell varies between 10 mm and 28 mm.

== Distribution ==
This marine species occurs off Florida, United States and in the Northern Caribbean Sea.
