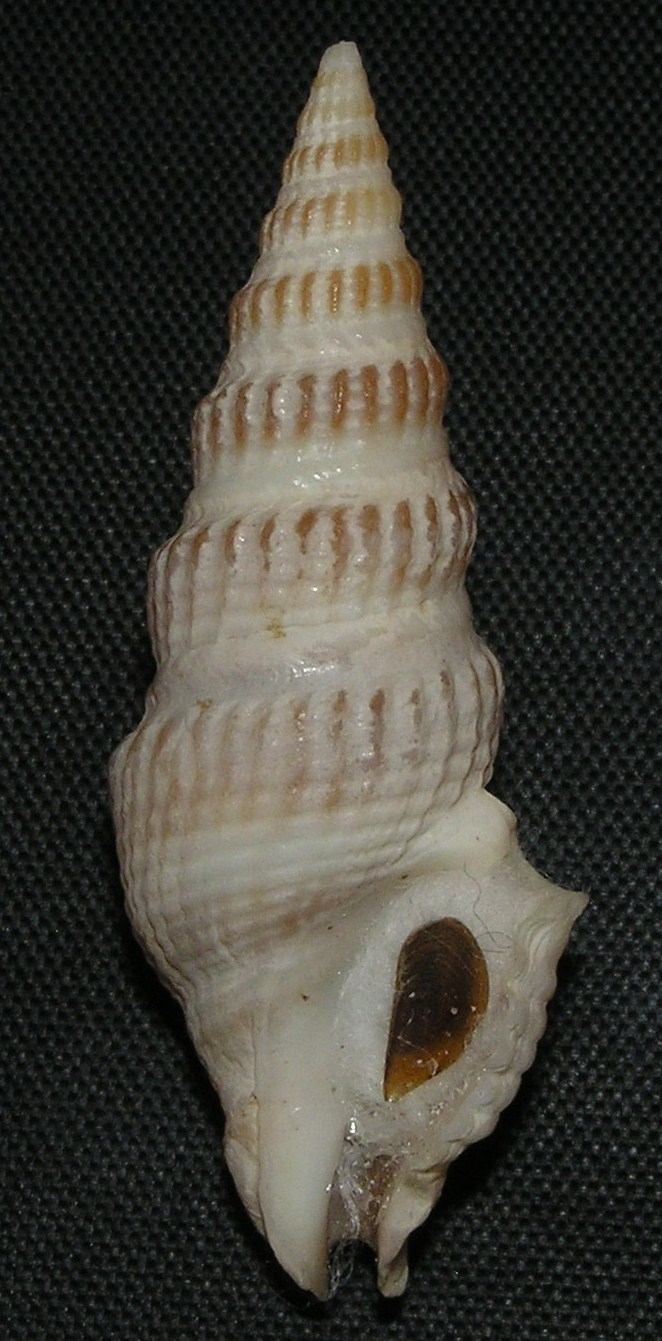
- Apertural view of a shell of Clathrodrillia gibbosa

Scientific classification
- Kingdom: Animalia
- Phylum: Mollusca
- Class: Gastropoda
- Subclass: Caenogastropoda
- Order: Neogastropoda
- Superfamily: Conoidea
- Family: Drilliidae
- Genus: Clathrodrillia
- Species: C. gibbosa

Binomial name
- Clathrodrillia gibbosa (Born, 1778)

Synonyms
- † Clathrodrillia mareana Weisbord, 1962; Drillia gibbosus Born, 1778; Murex gibbosus Born, 1778

= Clathrodrillia gibbosa =

Species of gastropod

Clathrodrillia gibbosa is a species of sea snail, a marine gastropod mollusk in the family Drilliidae.

== Description ==
The size of an adult shell varies between 20 mm and 60 mm. The shell is yellowish white or brownish, usually interruptedly broad-banded above and below the middle of the body whorl. The spire is turreted. The whorls are covered with a sutural cord and have a smooth, slightly concave shoulder The periphery is nodulous with the terminations of oblique, longitudinal ribs, which are crossed by strong revolving lines. The labium has a very strong projecting superior callus. The outer lip is winged, with a second small sinus indicated towards the base. The siphonal canal is short.

== Distribution ==
This species occurs in the Caribbean Sea off Colombia, Venezuela and Suriname.
