= Fenimorea glennduffyi =

Scientific classification
- Kingdom: Animalia
- Phylum: Mollusca
- Class: Gastropoda
- Subclass: Caenogastropoda
- Order: Neogastropoda
- Superfamily: Conoidea
- Family: Drilliidae
- Genus: Fenimorea
- Species: F. glennduffyi

Binomial name
- Fenimorea glennduffyi Fallon, 2016

Species of gastropod

Fenimorea glennduffyi is a species of sea snail, a marine gastropod mollusc in the family Drilliidae.

== Description ==
The length of this marine shell varies between 9 mm and 12 mm.

== Distribution ==
This marine species occurs in the Caribbean Sea off the Dominican Republic.
