= Crockerella scotti =

Scientific classification
- Kingdom: Animalia
- Phylum: Mollusca
- Class: Gastropoda
- Subclass: Caenogastropoda
- Order: Neogastropoda
- Superfamily: Conoidea
- Family: Clathurellidae
- Genus: Crockerella
- Species: C. scotti

Binomial name
- Crockerella scotti McLean, 1996

Species of gastropod

Crockerella scotti is a species of sea snail, a marine gastropod mollusk in the family Clathurellidae, the cone snails and their allies.
