= Clathrodrillia orellana =

Scientific classification
- Kingdom: Animalia
- Phylum: Mollusca
- Class: Gastropoda
- Subclass: Caenogastropoda
- Order: Neogastropoda
- Superfamily: Conoidea
- Family: Drilliidae
- Genus: Clathrodrillia
- Species: C. orellana

Binomial name
- Clathrodrillia orellana Dall, 1927

Synonyms
- Drillia orellana (Dall, 1927)

Species of gastropod

Clathrodrillia orellana is a species of sea snail, a marine gastropod mollusk in the family Drilliidae.

== Description ==
The shell grows to a length of 7.5 mm, its diameter 3.5 mm.

(Original description) The small, slender shell is whitish. The smooth protoconch contains 1½ whorls followed by 4½ subsequent whorls. The suture is distinct, not constricted or appressed. The anal sulcus is wide and shallow, the fasciole not excavated, inconspicuous. The axial sculpture consists of protractively flexuous incremental lines, stronger near the apex, and in some cases feeble narrow ribs are developed on the earlier whorls, with wider interspaces. The spiral sculpture consists of very fine threads, equal and with subequal interspaces, though a little coarser on the well-rounded base. The aperture is slightly wider than the siphonal canal. The outer lip is thin, flexuous, sometimes a feeble thickening behind it. The whorls are usually rounded but sometimes there is a slight shoulder in front of the fasciole. The columella is short and attenuated in front. The siphonal canal is short and wide.

== Distribution ==
This species occurs in the Atlantic Ocean off Georgia at a depth of 800 m.
