= Clathrodrillia marissae =

Scientific classification
- Kingdom: Animalia
- Phylum: Mollusca
- Class: Gastropoda
- Subclass: Caenogastropoda
- Order: Neogastropoda
- Superfamily: Conoidea
- Family: Drilliidae
- Genus: Clathrodrillia
- Species: C. marissae

Binomial name
- Clathrodrillia marissae Fallon, 2016

Species of gastropod

Clathrodrillia marissae is a species of sea snail, a marine gastropod mollusc in the family Drilliidae.

== Description ==
The length of the shell attains the length of 37 mm.

== Distribution ==
This marine species occurs in the Atlantic Ocean off Grand Bahama.
