= Decoradrillia harlequina =

Scientific classification
- Kingdom: Animalia
- Phylum: Mollusca
- Class: Gastropoda
- Subclass: Caenogastropoda
- Order: Neogastropoda
- Superfamily: Conoidea
- Family: Drilliidae
- Genus: Decoradrillia
- Species: D. harlequina

Binomial name
- Decoradrillia harlequina Fallon, 2016

Species of sea snail

Decoradrillia harlequina is a species of sea snail, a marine gastropod mollusc in the family Drilliidae.

== Distribution ==
This species occurs in the shallow waters of the Caribbean Sea, the Greater Antilles, the Lesser Antilles and off the Bahamas.
