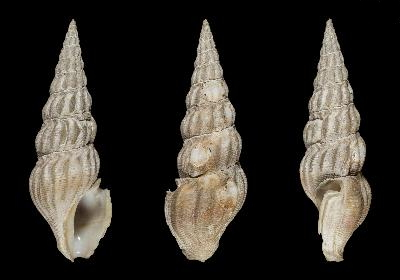
- Shell of Neodrillia princeps (holotype at MNHN, Paris)

Scientific classification
- Kingdom: Animalia
- Phylum: Mollusca
- Class: Gastropoda
- Subclass: Caenogastropoda
- Order: Neogastropoda
- Superfamily: Conoidea
- Family: Drilliidae
- Genus: Neodrillia
- Species: N. princeps

Binomial name
- Neodrillia princeps Fallon, 2016

= Neodrillia princeps =

Species of gastropod

Neodrillia princeps is a species of sea snail, a marine gastropod mollusc in the family Drilliidae.

== Description ==
The length of the shell varies between 32 mm and 47 mm.

== Distribution ==
This marine species occurs off French Guiana and Brazil.
