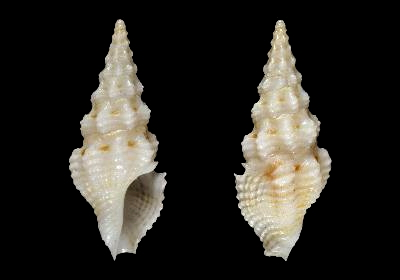
- Shells of Clathrodrillia guadeloupensis (holotype in the MNHN, Paris)

Scientific classification
- Kingdom: Animalia
- Phylum: Mollusca
- Class: Gastropoda
- Subclass: Caenogastropoda
- Order: Neogastropoda
- Superfamily: Conoidea
- Family: Drilliidae
- Genus: Clathrodrillia
- Species: C. guadeloupensis

Binomial name
- Clathrodrillia guadeloupensis Fallon, 2016

= Clathrodrillia guadeloupensis =

Species of gastropod

Clathrodrillia guadeloupensis is a species of sea snail, a marine gastropod mollusc in the family Drilliidae.

== Description ==
The length of the shell varies between 9 mm and 21 mm. It is predatory. Truncated spine with up to 11 whorls, the last of which is over 50% of total length, with strong axial ribs. Off white in color with bands of varying brown colors.

== Distribution ==
This marine species occurs in the Caribbean Sea off the Guadeloupe and Panama in the Guadeloupean Exclusive Economic Zone.
