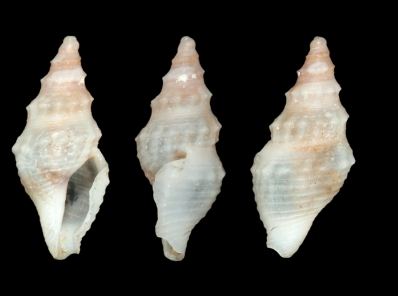
- Shell of Crockerella lowei (holotype at the Smithsonian Institution)

Scientific classification
- Kingdom: Animalia
- Phylum: Mollusca
- Class: Gastropoda
- Subclass: Caenogastropoda
- Order: Neogastropoda
- Superfamily: Conoidea
- Family: Clathurellidae
- Genus: Crockerella
- Species: C. lowei

Binomial name
- Crockerella lowei (W. H. Dall, 1903)

Synonyms
- Clathurella lowei Dall, 1903 (original combination); Crockerella hesione (Dall, 1919); Daphnella (Mangilia) lowei (W.H. Dall, 1903); Philbertia hesione Dall, 1919; Pseudodaphnella lowei (W. H. Dall, 1903)

= Crockerella lowei =

Species of gastropod

Crockerella lowei is a species of sea snail, a marine gastropod mollusk in the family Clathurellidae.

== Description ==
The length of the shell attains 9.5 mm, its diameter 4 mm.

The small, whitish shell has a biconic shape and is acute. It has a smooth bulbous protoconch of a 1½ whorl and four and a half subsequent sculptured whorls. The suture is distinct, not appressed. The anal fasciole close to it, is flattish, at first with fine spiral sculpture but on the body whorl it becomes nearly smooth. There is other spiral sculpture of a narrow prominent thread at the periphery which is doubled on the subsequent whorls. On the body whorl there are eleven of the threads which are somewhat nodulose where they override the ribs, with much wider interspaces, and a few close threads on the siphonal canal. The axial sculpture consists of about 13 somewhat oblique narrow ribs, extending from the suture to the shoulder on the spire, and on the body whorl obsolete on the base. They are separated by wider interspaces and the incremental lines are feeble. The aperture is narrow. The anal sulcus is narrow, deep, rounded, close to the suture, with a conspicuous subsutural callus. The outer lip is thin with a moderate varix behind it, and no internal lirae. The inner lip is erased. The columella is short. The siphonal canal is short, deep distinct, slightly constricted and recurved. There is a small nodule at the inner anterior end of the outer lip where the canal begins.

== Distribution ==
This marine species was found off Santa Rosa Island, California, USA.
