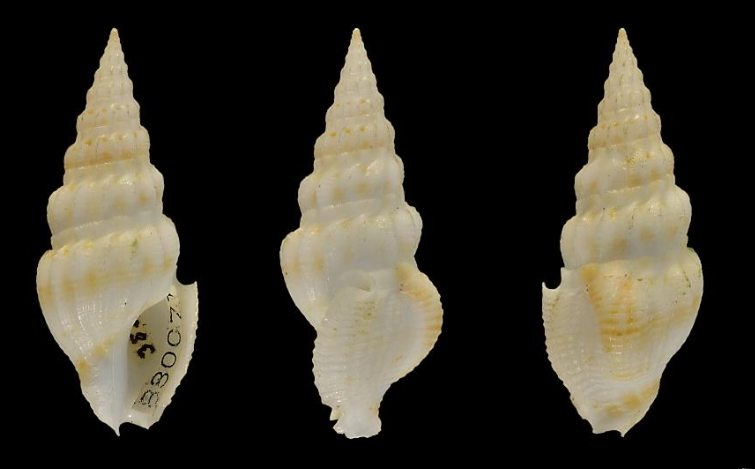
- Shell of Clathrodrillia petuchi (holotype at the Smithsonian Institution)

Scientific classification
- Kingdom: Animalia
- Phylum: Mollusca
- Class: Gastropoda
- Subclass: Caenogastropoda
- Order: Neogastropoda
- Superfamily: Conoidea
- Family: Drilliidae
- Genus: Clathrodrillia
- Species: C. petuchi

Binomial name
- Clathrodrillia petuchi (Tippett, 1995)

Synonyms
- Drillia (Clathrodrillia) petuchi Tippett, 1995 (basionym); Drillia petuchi Tippett, 1995 (original combination)

= Clathrodrillia petuchi =

Species of mollusc

Clathrodrillia petuchi is a species of sea snail, a marine gastropod mollusk in the family Drilliidae.

== Description ==
The size of an adult shell varies between 30 mm and 53 mm. It is hollow on the inside. it has a short aperture and narrow oval, anterior canal.

== Distribution ==
This species occurs in the Western Atlantic Ocean and the Caribbean Sea.
