= Neodrillia crassa =

Scientific classification
- Kingdom: Animalia
- Phylum: Mollusca
- Class: Gastropoda
- Subclass: Caenogastropoda
- Order: Neogastropoda
- Superfamily: Conoidea
- Family: Drilliidae
- Genus: Neodrillia
- Species: N. crassa

Binomial name
- Neodrillia crassa Fallon, 2016

Species of gastropod

Neodrillia crassa is a species of sea snail, a marine gastropod mollusk belonging to the family Drilliidae.

== Description ==
The shell is medium-sized, reaching up to 26.8 mm long. It is white with a golden-brown band and has a tall spire. The surface is dull and has raised lines and ridges. Some parts may be missing or eroded. The opening is white.

== Etymology ==
The Neodrillia is named for the rough shell surface and appearance of examined specimens. From the Latin adjective crassus, feminine crassa, meaning coarse.

== Distribution ==
This marine species occurs off Barbados, Dominica, Guadeloupe and the Netherlands Antilles.
