= Clathrodrillia allyniana =

Scientific classification
- Kingdom: Animalia
- Phylum: Mollusca
- Class: Gastropoda
- Subclass: Caenogastropoda
- Order: Neogastropoda
- Superfamily: Conoidea
- Family: Drilliidae
- Genus: Clathrodrillia
- Species: C. allyniana

Binomial name
- Clathrodrillia allyniana (Hertlein & Strong, 1951)

Synonyms
- Cymatosyrinx allyniana Hertlein & Strong, 1951; Drillia (Clathrodrillia) allyniana (Hertlein and Strong, 1951)

Species of gastropod

Clathrodrillia allyniana is a species of sea snail, a marine gastropod mollusk in the family Drilliidae.

== Description ==
The shell grows to a length of 21 mm.

== Distribution ==
This species is found in the Gulf of California, Western Mexico.
