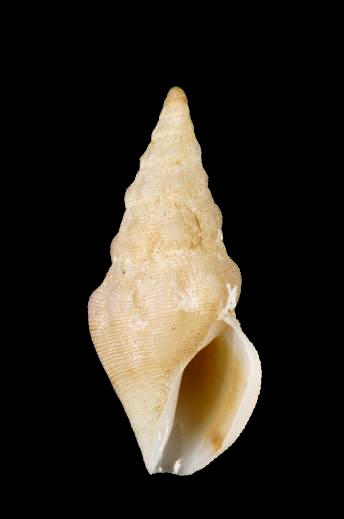
- Shell of Neodrillia cydia (specimen in the MNHN, Paris)

Scientific classification
- Kingdom: Animalia
- Phylum: Mollusca
- Class: Gastropoda
- Subclass: Caenogastropoda
- Order: Neogastropoda
- Superfamily: Conoidea
- Family: Drilliidae
- Genus: Neodrillia
- Species: N. cydia

Binomial name
- Neodrillia cydia Bartsch, 1943

Synonyms
- Drillia antiguensis P. Bartsch, 1943; Drillia cydia (Bartsch, 1943); Drillia encia P. Bartsch, 1943; Drillia jamaicensis P. Bartsch, 1943; Drillia ustickei B. Hayes, 1959; Drillia (Neodrillia) cydia (Bartsch, 1943); Fenimorea ustickei (Nowell-Usticke, 1959); Inodrillia ustickei Hayes, M. in Nowell-Usticke, G.W., 1959; Neodrillia antiguensis Bartsch, P., 1943; Neodrillia barbadensis Bartsch, P., 1943; Neodrillia encia Bartsch, P., 1943; Neodrillia jamaicensis Bartsch, P., 1943

= Neodrillia cydia =

Species of gastropod

Neodrillia cydia, with common name the Cydia drillia, is a species of sea snail, a marine gastropod mollusk in the family Drilliidae.

== Description ==
Neodrillia cydia is a small, predatory sea snail known for its robust, high-spired shell. The shell typically ranges from 10 mm to 22 mm in length, with an average size around 13.7 mm.

This species is distinguishable from similar ones by its stout shape, prominent spiral threads, and a notched anal sinus. While it resembles all-white Fenimorea species in both size and form, it stands apart due to its fewer ribs, more rounded whorl shoulders, and coarser surface texture.

== Distribution ==
This species occurs in the Western Atlantic Ocean of North Carolina, in the Caribbean Sea of Panama and Jamaica, and in the waters around the Lesser Antilles (Antigua, Barbados, St. Thomas).
