= Clathrodrillia walteri =

Scientific classification
- Kingdom: Animalia
- Phylum: Mollusca
- Class: Gastropoda
- Subclass: Caenogastropoda
- Order: Neogastropoda
- Superfamily: Conoidea
- Family: Drilliidae
- Genus: Clathrodrillia
- Species: C. walteri

Binomial name
- Clathrodrillia walteri (Smith M., 1946)

Synonyms
- Crassispira walteri Smith M., 1946

Species of gastropod

Clathrodrillia walteri is a species of sea snail, a marine gastropod mollusk in the family Drilliidae, which lives in the Pacific Ocean off the Pearl Islands, Panama, in shells up to 38 millimetres long.
