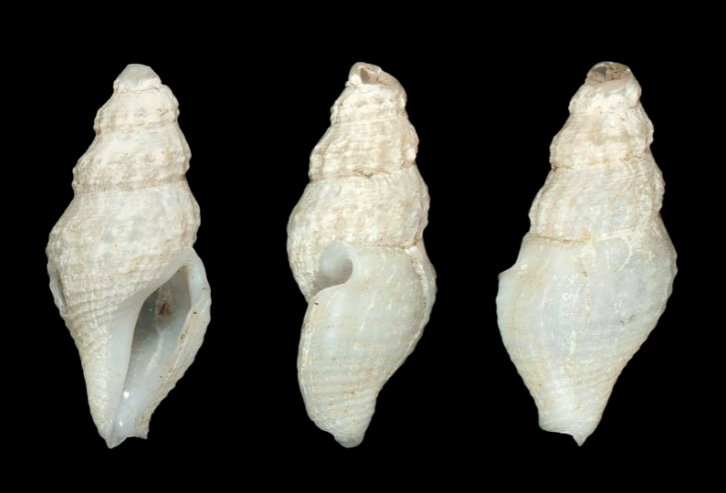
- Shell of Crockerella philodice (holotype at the Smithsonian Institution)

Scientific classification
- Kingdom: Animalia
- Phylum: Mollusca
- Class: Gastropoda
- Subclass: Caenogastropoda
- Order: Neogastropoda
- Superfamily: Conoidea
- Family: Clathurellidae
- Genus: Crockerella
- Species: C. philodice

Binomial name
- Crockerella philodice (W. H. Dall, 1919)

Synonyms
- Mangilia philodice W. H. Dall, 1919 (original description)

= Crockerella philodice =

Species of gastropod

Crockerella philodice is a species of sea snail, a marine gastropod mollusk in the family Clathurellidae,.

== Description ==
The length of the shell attains 7.5 mm, its diameter 3 mm.

(Original description) The small, white shell has four or more whorls, exclusive of the (lost) protoconch. The suture is distinct, not appressed. The whorls slope behind and are rounded in front. The axial sculpture consists of (on the penultimate whorl about 17) short rounded ribs with subequal interspaces, hardly extended over the periphery and gradually becoming obsolete on the body whorl . Incremental lines are somewhat conspicuous on the base where they slightly reticulate the spiral sculpture. The latter comprises three prominent cords on the periphery equal and equidistant, swollen where they over ride the ribs, and feebler on the body whorl. The anal fasciole carries finer equal spiral threads, the base 10 or more somewhat larger and more nearly adjacent as they approach the siphonal canal. The aperture is rather narrow. The outer lip is solid and sharp-edged. The anal sulcus is large, rounded, close to the suture. The inner lip is erased. The siphonal canal is short, deep and slightly recurved.

== Distribution ==
This marine species was found off Monterey Bay, California, USA
