= Decoradrillia festiva =

Scientific classification
- Kingdom: Animalia
- Phylum: Mollusca
- Class: Gastropoda
- Subclass: Caenogastropoda
- Order: Neogastropoda
- Superfamily: Conoidea
- Family: Drilliidae
- Genus: Decoradrillia
- Species: D. festiva

Binomial name
- Decoradrillia festiva Fallon, 2016

Species of gastropod

Decoradrillia festiva is a species of sea snail, a marine gastropod mollusc in the family Drilliidae.

== Distribution ==
This species occurs in the shallow waters of the Western Atlantic Ocean off Bahia, Brazil.
