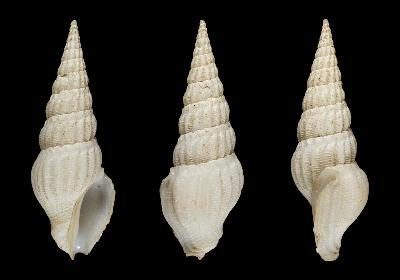
- Shells of Clathrodrillia garciai (holotype in the MNHN, Paris)

Scientific classification
- Kingdom: Animalia
- Phylum: Mollusca
- Class: Gastropoda
- Subclass: Caenogastropoda
- Order: Neogastropoda
- Superfamily: Conoidea
- Family: Drilliidae
- Genus: Clathrodrillia
- Species: C. garciai

Binomial name
- Clathrodrillia garciai Fallon, 2016

= Clathrodrillia garciai =

Species of gastropod

Clathrodrillia garciai is a species of sea snail, a marine gastropod mollusc in the family Drilliidae.

== Description ==
The length of the shell varies between 10 mm and 31 mm.

== Distribution ==
This marine species occurs in the Caribbean Sea off the Campeche Bank, French Guiana and Suriname, in the Gulf of Mexico off Louisiana, Alabama and Mississippi; and off Brazil.
