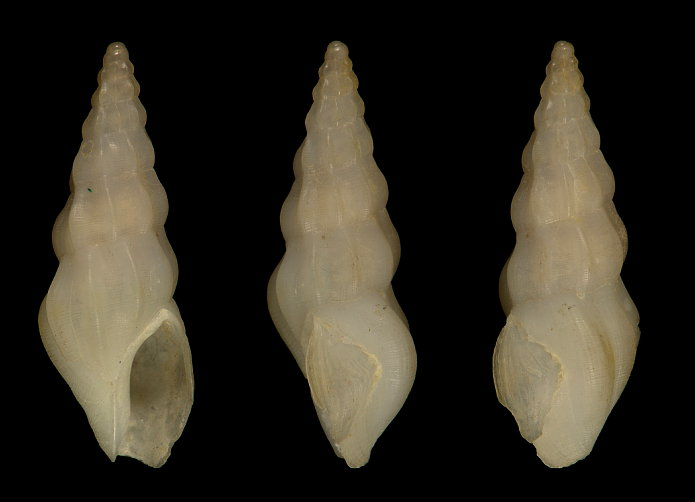
- shell of Fenimorea pagodula (syntype at the Smithsonian Institution)

Scientific classification
- Kingdom: Animalia
- Phylum: Mollusca
- Class: Gastropoda
- Subclass: Caenogastropoda
- Order: Neogastropoda
- Superfamily: Conoidea
- Family: Drilliidae
- Genus: Fenimorea
- Species: F. pagodula

Binomial name
- Fenimorea pagodula (Dall, 1889)

Synonyms
- Cymatosyrinx pagodula M. Smith, 1951; Drillia pagodula Dall, 1889 (basionym); Drillia (Cymatosyrinx) pagodula Cossmann, 1896; Splendrillia pagodula Petuch, 1994

= Fenimorea pagodula =

Species of gastropod

Fenimorea pagodula is a species of sea snail, a marine gastropod mollusc in the family Drilliidae.

== Description ==
The size of an adult shell varies between 10 mm and 18 mm.

(Original description) The shell resembles Fenimorea fucata, but is much more slender, the fasciole less impressed. The spiral sculpture consists of fine engraved lines and the aperture is smaller and much more narrow.

The protoconch is glassy, rounded and two-whorled. The shell contains eight or nine strongly ribbed whorls. The spiral sculpture, sometimes obsolete near the suture, consists of extremely fine, wavy, close-set, incised lines. The transverse sculpture consists of (on the penultimate whorl 9 to 11) nearly straight stout ribs extending from the suture over the periphery and lost on the base. The fasciole is not well marked;. The suture is distinct, somewhat appressed, undulated by passing over the ribs. The surface of the shell is more or less lustrous. Its color is white, spirally banded with rich yellow brown, sometimes on the periphery, sometimes on the base, etc., but the fasciole is usually white and the ribs are apt to show white, wholly or in part on the yellow, when present. The aperture is short, narrow, with hardly any siphonal canal. The anal sulcus is large and deeper than wide. The outer lip is thin and not internally lirate. The throat is white. The inner lip is a little callous. The short columella is simple. The siphonal canal is very short and not differentiated from the aperture. The varix is stout and prominent. (described as Drillia pagodula)

== Distribution ==
This species occurs in the demersal zone of the Caribbean Sea, the Gulf of Mexico and the Lesser Antilles; in the Atlantic Ocean from Florida to Brazil at depths between 30 m and 282 m.

This species was also found as a fossil in the strata of the Caloosahatchee Formation, Quaternary of Florida at North St Petersburg
