= Crockerella crystallina =

Scientific classification
- Kingdom: Animalia
- Phylum: Mollusca
- Class: Gastropoda
- Subclass: Caenogastropoda
- Order: Neogastropoda
- Family: Clathurellidae
- Genus: Crockerella
- Species: C. crystallina

Binomial name
- Crockerella crystallina (Gabb, 1865)

Synonyms
- Clathurella crystallina Gabb, 1865

Species of gastropod

Crockerella crystallina is a species of sea snail, a marine gastropod mollusk in the family Conidae, the cone snails and their allies.
