= Decoradrillia =

Scientific classification
- Kingdom: Animalia
- Phylum: Mollusca
- Class: Gastropoda
- Subclass: Caenogastropoda
- Order: Neogastropoda
- Superfamily: Conoidea
- Family: Drilliidae
- Genus: Decoradrillia; Fallon, 2016

Type species
- Decoradrillia harlequina Fallon, 2016

Species
- See text

Genus of gastropods

Decoradrillia is a genus of sea snails, marine gastropod mollusks in the family Drilliidae.

== Species ==
Species within the genus Decoradrillia include:

- Decoradrillia colorea Fallon, 2016
- Decoradrillia festiva Fallon, 2016
- Decoradrillia harlequina Fallon, 2016
- Decoradrillia interstincta Fallon, 2016
- Decoradrillia pulchella (Reeve, 1845)

Species brought into synonymy

- Decoradrillia halidorema (Schwengel, 1940): synonym of Decoradrillia pulchella (Reeve, 1845)
