= Clathrodrillia inimica =

Scientific classification
- Kingdom: Animalia
- Phylum: Mollusca
- Class: Gastropoda
- Subclass: Caenogastropoda
- Order: Neogastropoda
- Superfamily: Conoidea
- Family: Drilliidae
- Genus: Clathrodrillia
- Species: C. inimica

Binomial name
- Clathrodrillia inimica Dall, 1927

Synonyms
- Drillia inimica (Dall, 1927)

Species of gastropod

Clathrodrillia inimica is a species of sea snail, a marine gastropod mollusk in the family Drilliidae.

== Description ==
The shell grows to a length of 6.6 mm, its diameter 3 mm.

(Original description) The minute shell minute is white. The blunt, smooth protoconch contains 1½ to 2 whorls. The five subsequent whorls are prominently sculptured. The suture is distinct, appressed; the edge in front thickened and undulated by the sculpture. The anal sulcus is shallow but the fasciole constricted and nearly smooth. The axial sculpture consists of (on the body whorl 16) narrow, nearly straight rounded ribs with subequal or narrower interspaces, crossing the whorls from a slight shoulder in front of the anal fasciole to the succeeding suture and becoming gradually obsolete on the base. The incremental lines are well marked. The spiral sculpture shows on the second normal whorl 3, on the next 4, and on the body whorl 10 slender threads with wider interspaces, overrunning the ribs and in front of these finer close-set threads on the columella. The aperture is hardly wider than the siphonal canal. The thin outer lip is arcuately produced in front. The columella is very short and attenuated in front.

== Distribution ==
This species occurs in the Atlantic Ocean off Georgia.
