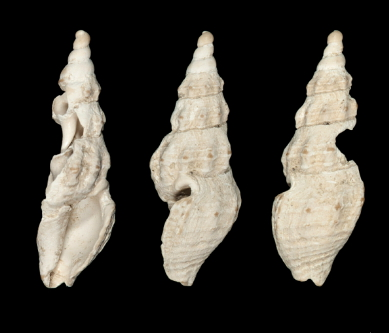
- Shell of Crockerella eriphyle (lectotype at the Smithsonian Institution)

Scientific classification
- Kingdom: Animalia
- Phylum: Mollusca
- Class: Gastropoda
- Subclass: Caenogastropoda
- Order: Neogastropoda
- Superfamily: Conoidea
- Family: Clathurellidae
- Genus: Crockerella
- Species: C. eriphyle

Binomial name
- Crockerella eriphyle (W.H. Dall, 1919)

Synonyms
- Mangilia eriphyle W.H. Dall, 1919

= Crockerella eriphyle =

Species of gastropod

Crockerella eriphyle is a species of sea snail, a marine gastropod mollusk in the family Clathurellidae.

== Description ==
The shell attains a length of 10.5 mm, and its diameter is 4 mm.

(Original description) The small, solid shell is whitish in color. Its shape is acute and fusiform. It contains 1½ whorls in the protoconch and six subsequent whorls. The protoconch has a minute apex and a swollen smooth globular succeeding whorl. These are followed by a peripherally keeled whorl, the subsequent whorls. These develop into two and then three spiral flattish spiral cords, including the peripheral one and in front of it, while behind the keel the surface slopes flatly up to the oppressed suture only interrupted by obscure ridges due to the axial sculpture. On the body whorl in front of the anal fasciole there are about a dozen similar cords extending to the end of the siphonal canal with about equal channeled inter-spaces, the posterior two or three cords more or less nodulous at the intersections. The axial sculpture consists of about 10 more or less prominent rib-lets beginning in front of the fasciole and extending slightly over the periphery on the body whorl becoming obsolete. The incremental lines are not conspicuous. The aperture is narrowly ovate. The outer lip is somewhat varicose with a large shallow rounded anal sulcus close to the suture. Within, both inner and outer lips are smooth and moderately callous. The siphonal canal is short, wide and slightly recurved.

== Distribution ==
This marine species was found off Santa Rosa Island, California, USA, and from Esteros Bay, California, to Coronado Islands.
