= Decoradrillia interstincta =

Scientific classification
- Kingdom: Animalia
- Phylum: Mollusca
- Class: Gastropoda
- Subclass: Caenogastropoda
- Order: Neogastropoda
- Superfamily: Conoidea
- Family: Drilliidae
- Genus: Decoradrillia
- Species: D. interstincta

Binomial name
- Decoradrillia interstincta Fallon, 2016

Species of gastropod

Decoradrillia interstincta is a species of sea snail, a marine gastropod mollusc in the family Drilliidae.

== Distribution ==
This species occurs in the shallow waters of the Caribbean Sea off Honduras.
