= Fenimorea nivalis =

Scientific classification
- Kingdom: Animalia
- Phylum: Mollusca
- Class: Gastropoda
- Subclass: Caenogastropoda
- Order: Neogastropoda
- Superfamily: Conoidea
- Family: Drilliidae
- Genus: Fenimorea
- Species: F. nivalis

Binomial name
- Fenimorea nivalis Fallon, 2016

Species of gastropod

Fenimorea nivalis is a species of sea snail, a marine gastropod mollusc in the family Drilliidae.

== Description ==
The length of this marine shell varies between 10 mm and 17 mm. Fenimorea nivalis are actively mobile, carnivores and have limited vision.

== Distribution ==
This marine species occurs off Puerto Rico, Dominican Republic, the Bahamas and Brazil.
