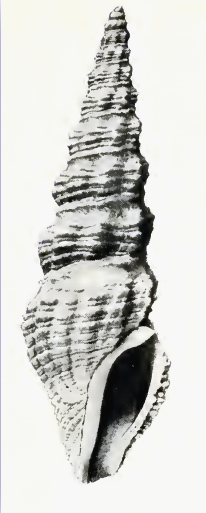
- Original image of a shell of Clathrodrillia callianira

Scientific classification
- Kingdom: Animalia
- Phylum: Mollusca
- Class: Gastropoda
- Subclass: Caenogastropoda
- Order: Neogastropoda
- Superfamily: Conoidea
- Family: Drilliidae
- Genus: Clathrodrillia
- Species: C. callianira

Binomial name
- Clathrodrillia callianira Dall W.H., 1919

= Clathrodrillia callianira =

Species of gastropod

Clathrodrillia callianira is a species of sea snail, a marine gastropod mollusc in the family Drilliidae.

== Description ==
The height of the shell attains 16 mm, its diameter 5.5 mm.

(Original description) The slender, acute shell is pale brownish. The protoconch is smooth regularly increasing containing 2½ whorls. The teleoconch contains 8½ subsequent whorls. The suture is closely appressed with a cord-like edge behind the strongly constricted, arcuately striated anal fasciole. The spiral sculpture consists of (on the penultimate whorl about seven) flattish, close-set cords. In some specimens these alternate in size, in others they are nearly equal. On the body whorl there are about 25, some irregularly larger than the others, and a few smaller threads on the siphonal canal . The axial sculpture consists of (on the body whorl 10 to 14) rounded ribs with subequal interspaces, more conspicuous and less numerous as we ascend the spire, over which the spiral sculpture passes without nodulation. The aperture is short, subovate. The anal sulcus is short rounded, with a subsutural callus. The outer lip is arcuate, thin, smooth inside, without any marked varix behind it. The inner lip and columella show a smooth callus. The siphonal canal is short and slightly recurved.

== Distribution ==
This species occurs in the Pacific Ocean off the Baja California Peninsula and the Gulf of California to Acapulco, Mexico.
