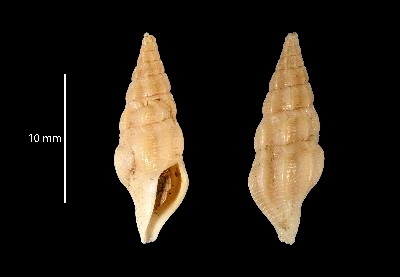
- Shell of Clathrodrillia wolfei (paratype at MNHN, Paris)

Scientific classification
- Kingdom: Animalia
- Phylum: Mollusca
- Class: Gastropoda
- Subclass: Caenogastropoda
- Order: Neogastropoda
- Superfamily: Conoidea
- Family: Drilliidae
- Genus: Clathrodrillia
- Species: C. wolfei

Binomial name
- Clathrodrillia wolfei (Tippett, 1995)

Synonyms
- Drillia (Drillia) wolfei Tippett, 1995 (basionym); Drillia wolfei Tippett, 1995 (original combination)

= Clathrodrillia wolfei =

Species of gastropod

Clathrodrillia wolfei is a species of sea snail, a marine gastropod mollusk in the family Drilliidae.

== Description ==
The length of an adult shell varies between 14 mm and 19 mm.

== Distribution ==
This species occurs in the Western Atlantic Ocean (on the North Carolina Shelf) and the Caribbean Sea off Mexico; in the Gulf of Mexico off Alabama, Florida, Louisiana.
