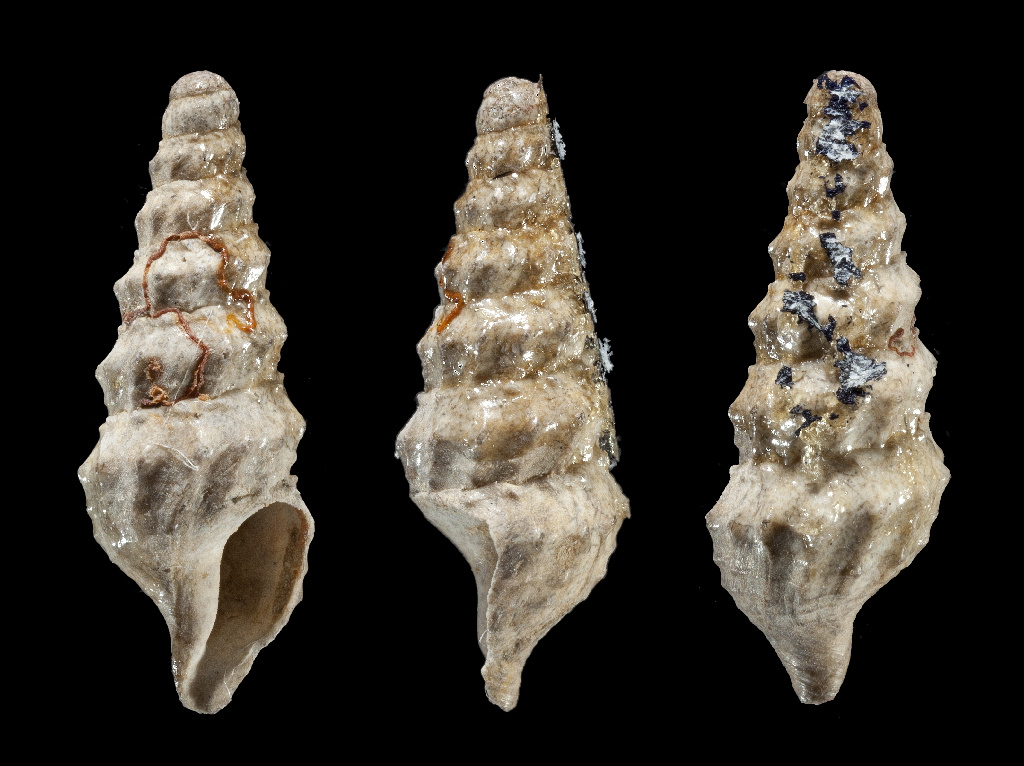
- Shell of Clathrodrillia lophoessa (specimen at the Natural History Museum, London)

Scientific classification
- Kingdom: Animalia
- Phylum: Mollusca
- Class: Gastropoda
- Subclass: Caenogastropoda
- Order: Neogastropoda
- Superfamily: Conoidea
- Family: Drilliidae
- Genus: Clathrodrillia
- Species: C. lophoessa

Binomial name
- Clathrodrillia lophoessa (Watson, 1882)

Synonyms
- Clionella lophoessa R.B. Watson, 1882; Kurtzia lophoessa R.B. Watson, 1882; Micropleurotomella lophoessa R.B. Watson, 1882; Pleurotoma (Drillia) lophoëssa Watson, 1882 (original combination)

= Clathrodrillia lophoessa =

Species of gastropod

Clathrodrillia lophoessa is a species of sea snail, a marine gastropod mollusk in the family Drilliidae.

== Description ==
The length of the shell attains 9 mm.

== Distribution ==
This species occurs in the Gulf of Mexico and in the Atlantic Ocean off Pernambuco, Brazil at depths of 640 m to 1,234 m.
