= Fenimorea marmarina =

Scientific classification
- Kingdom: Animalia
- Phylum: Mollusca
- Class: Gastropoda
- Subclass: Caenogastropoda
- Order: Neogastropoda
- Superfamily: Conoidea
- Family: Drilliidae
- Genus: Fenimorea
- Species: F. marmarina

Binomial name
- Fenimorea marmarina (Watson, 1881)

Synonyms
- Clavatula marmarina (Watson, 1881); Drillia marmarina Watson, 1881; Pleurotoma (Clavus) marmarina Watson, 1881 (basionym); Pleurotoma marmarina Watson, 1881

Species of gastropod

Fenimorea marmarina is a species of sea snail, a marine gastropod mollusk in the family Drilliidae.

== Description ==
The shell grows to a length of 17 mm.

(Original description) Shell.—Biconical, with a high pointed spire, a short lopsided base, and a very short snout, ribbed, barely tubercled, with spiral furrows, and a compressed band below the scarcely impressed suture. Sculpture. Longitudinals—there are on the body whorl 15 rather narrow, spread-out, rounded, scarcely oblique direct ribs. These begin at the upper suture and extend to the base, but not to the snout. Near the top they are cut by a spiral furrow, so that the upper part of them forms a series of small rounded tubercles just below the suture. Below the spiral furrow the ribs are slightly swollen into knots. The ribs are parted by wider shallow furrows: these ribs and furrows run pretty regularly down the spire, but there are fewer of them on the earlier whorls. The whole surface is further scored by almost microscopic regular hair-like lines of growth, which are specially sharp whorls, which constricts both the ribs and the interstices. On the body whorl there are 18 or 20 shallow and narrow furrows parted by flat interstices of about three times their width. These do not extend to the sinus-area, and only very doubtfully to the snout, where there are rather a few irregular and scarcely raised rounded threads. These furrows are not recognizable on the earlier whorls. The whole surface is very delicately fretted with almost microscopic, crisp spiral striae whose course is not quite regular, and which are crimped or disturbed by the lines of growth. This sculpture is particularly sharp and distinct in the sinus-area.

The colour of the shell is pure marble-white.

The spire is very regularly conical. There are about two embryonic whorls on the protoconch, which are small, nearly cylindrical, with scarcely appreciable suture, and end in a blunt, round, laterally flattened-down tip. The shell contains 10 whorls in all, rather short and broad, scarcely at all convex. The body whorl is large, being broad and tumid, but not long, with a tumidly conical lop-sided base, ending in a short, broad, flat snout which is abruptly and straight cut off. The suture islinear, but well defined by the swelling of the infrasutural row of tubercles. The aperture is oval, with an acute angle above, an obtuse angle at the side where the body and the columella join, and a truncation at the point. The outer lip is thin, a little patulous, with an equable convex curve throughout. The anal sinus is very shallow and round, with no shelf above it; and below it is a very high but little prominent shoulder made by the very slightly advancing lip-edge. The inner lip is very narrow, shallowly hollowed into the substance of the shell. The columella is straight, conical, and is obliquely cut off in front with a blunt, rounded, scarcely twisted edge.

== Distribution ==
This species occurs in the Atlantic Ocean off Northeast Brazil.
