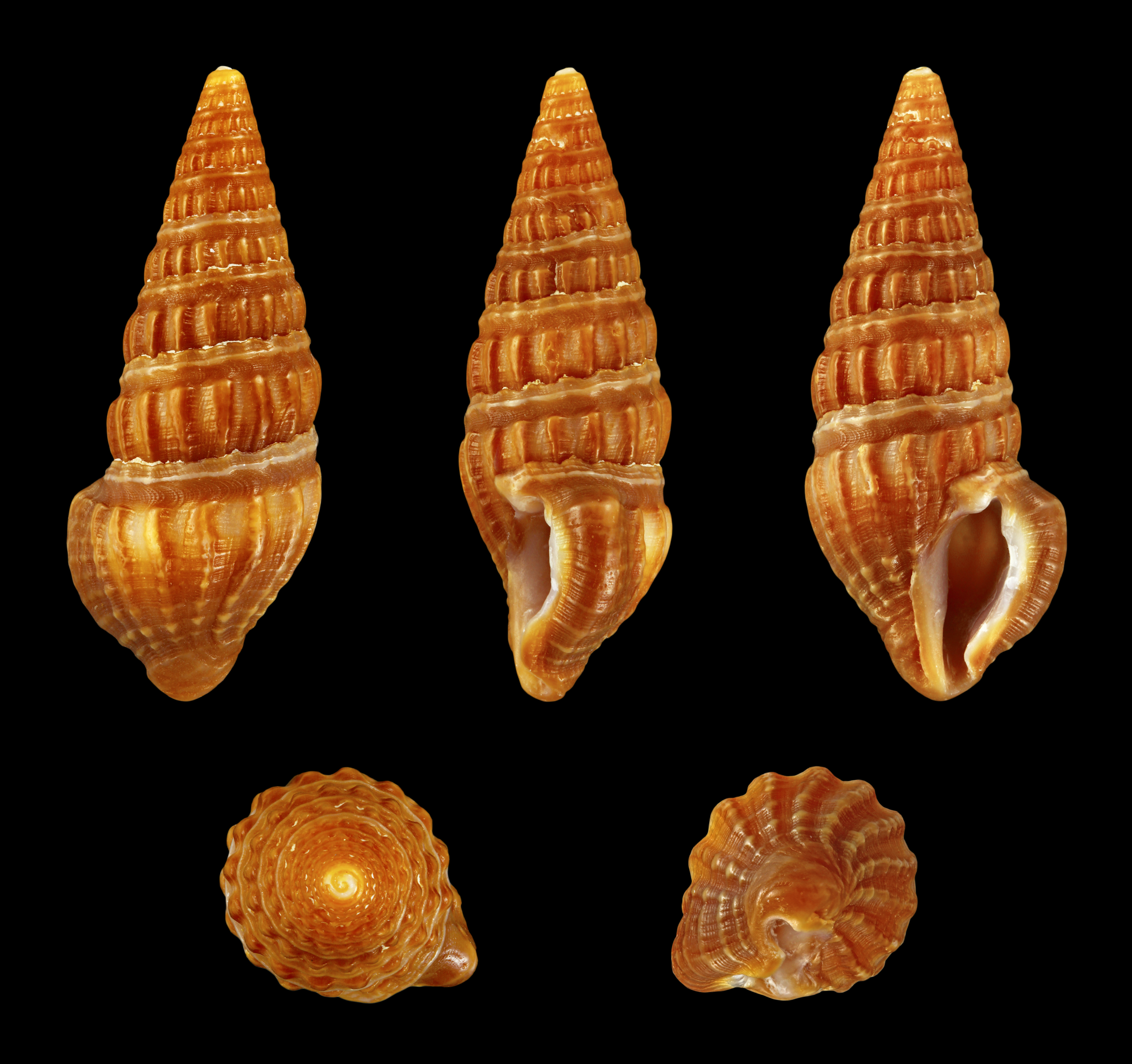
- Shell of Pyrgospira tampaensis

Scientific classification
- Kingdom: Animalia
- Phylum: Mollusca
- Class: Gastropoda
- Subclass: Caenogastropoda
- Order: Neogastropoda
- Superfamily: Conoidea
- Family: Pseudomelatomidae
- Genus: Pyrgospira
- Species: P. tampaensis

Binomial name
- Pyrgospira tampaensis (Bartsch & Rehder, 1939)

Synonyms
- Crassispira (Crassispirella) tampaensis Bartsch & Rehder, 1939; Crassispira tampaensis bartschi L. Perry, 1940

= Pyrgospira tampaensis =

Species of gastropod

Pyrgospira tampaensis, common name the Tampa turrid, is a species of small to medium-sized sea snail, a marine gastropod mollusk in the family Pseudomelatomidae.

== Description ==
The size of the shell of this species varies between 10 mm and 32 mm.

== Distribution ==
This species occurs in the Caribbean Sea and in the Gulf of Mexico; in the Atlantic Ocean from North Carolina, United States, to Northern Brazil; fossils have been found in Quaternary strata in Florida, United States, age range: 2.588 to 0.012 Ma.
