= Fenimorea jongreenlawi =

Scientific classification
- Kingdom: Animalia
- Phylum: Mollusca
- Class: Gastropoda
- Subclass: Caenogastropoda
- Order: Neogastropoda
- Superfamily: Conoidea
- Family: Drilliidae
- Genus: Fenimorea
- Species: F. jongreenlawi

Binomial name
- Fenimorea jongreenlawi Fallon, 2016

Species of gastropod

Fenimorea jongreenlawi is a species of sea snail, a marine gastropod mollusc in the family Drilliidae.

== Description ==
The length of this marine shell varies between 9 mm and 12.5 mm.

== Distribution ==
This marine species occurs off the Lesser Antilles, Trinidad and Tobago; St Vincent and the Grenadines.
