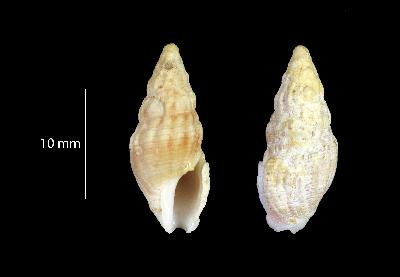
- Shell of Fenimorea chaaci (paratype in the MNHN, Paris)

Scientific classification
- Kingdom: Animalia
- Phylum: Mollusca
- Class: Gastropoda
- Subclass: Caenogastropoda
- Order: Neogastropoda
- Superfamily: Conoidea
- Family: Drilliidae
- Genus: Fenimorea
- Species: F. chaaci

Binomial name
- Fenimorea chaaci (Espinosa & Rolan, 1995)

Synonyms
- Clathrodrillia chaaci (Espinosa & Rolán, 1995); Drillia (Clathrodrillia) chaaci Espinosa & Rolán, 1995 (basionym); Drillia chaaci Espinosa & Rolan, 1995

= Fenimorea chaaci =

Species of gastropod

Fenimorea chaaci is a species of sea snail, a marine gastropod mollusk in the family Drilliidae.

== Description ==
The shell grows to a length of 20 mm.

== Distribution ==
This species occurs in the Caribbean Sea off Yucatán, Mexico.
