= Pyrgospira aenone =

Scientific classification
- Kingdom: Animalia
- Phylum: Mollusca
- Class: Gastropoda
- Subclass: Caenogastropoda
- Order: Neogastropoda
- Superfamily: Conoidea
- Family: Pseudomelatomidae
- Genus: Pyrgospira
- Species: P. aenone

Binomial name
- Pyrgospira aenone v

Synonyms
- Clathrodrillia aenone Dall, W.H., 1919; Clathrodrillia nautica Pilsbry, H.A. & H.N. Lowe, 1932; Crassispira tomliniana Melvill, J.C., 1927; Drillia aenone (Dall, W.H., 1919); Pleurotoma obeliscus Reeve, 1845; Pyrgospira nautica Pilsbry & Lowe, 1932; Pyrgospira obeliscus (Reeve, 1845); Pyrgospira tomliniana Melvill, 1927

Species of gastropod

Pyrgospira aenone is a species of sea snail, a marine gastropod mollusk in the family Pseudomelatomidae.

== Description ==
The size of the shell varies between 18 mm and 40 mm.

The yellowish brown shell contains about seven whorls exclusive of the (lost) protoconch. The spire is acute. The whorls are markedly shouldered. The suture is strongly appressed with a strong cord in front of it. The anal fasciole is excavated, arcuately striated, with a few obscure fine spiral threads running in it. The axial sculpture consists of (on the body whorl fifteen) short prominent nearly vertical subrectangular ribs rounded above and confined to the peripheral region in front of which on the base of the body whorl are about twice as many thread-like ridges mostly continuous over the base to the beginning of the siphonal canal. The incremental lines are rather marked. The spiral sculpture consists of three or four threads with wider interspaces overrunning and sometimes slightly nodulating the peripheral ribs. In front of these on the base are about eight spiral threads conspicuously nodulous at the intersections with the minor ridges, and with much wider interspaces. On the younger shells these threads are more close set, fewer and less nodulous, the minor ridges inconspicuous. Finally between these in the adult are more or less distinct finer spiral striae. The siphonal canal is also spirally threaded with a conspicuous siphonal fasciole. The aperture is rather narrow with a well marked anal sulcus close to the suture, and on the body a prominent subsutural callus. The outer lip is produced, sharp-edged and smooth within. The inner lip is callous. The outer edge of the enamel is slightly raised, and on the siphonal canal prominent with a chink between it and the siphonal fasciole. The siphonal canal is short and recurved.

== Distribution ==
This species occurs in the Pacific Ocean from Nicaragua to Panama; also off the Galápagos Islands.
