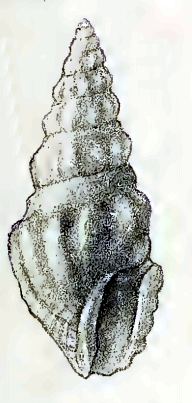
- Original image of a shell of Drillia euphanes

Scientific classification
- Kingdom: Animalia
- Phylum: Mollusca
- Class: Gastropoda
- Subclass: Caenogastropoda
- Order: Neogastropoda
- Superfamily: Conoidea
- Family: Drilliidae
- Genus: Drillia
- Species: D. euphanes

Binomial name
- Drillia euphanes Melvill, J.C., 1923

Synonyms
- Neodrillia euphanes (Melvill J.C., 1923)

= Drillia euphanes =

Species of gastropod

Drillia euphanes is a species of sea snail, a marine gastropod mollusk in the family Drilliidae.

== Description ==
The length of the shell attains 12 mm, its diameter 5 mm.

(Original description) The fusiform, rather solid shell is white. It contains 8 whorls, of which two are in the protoconch, globular, white, smooth. The remainder are suturally impressed. They show regular incrassate nodulous longitudinal ribs, bluntly angled at the periphery. The nodules are large and shining. The ribs on the body whorl number eight or nine. These are crossed by somewhat coarse revolving lines, which, in the specimens before us, are nearly obsolete. The aperture is roundly-ovate. The sinus is rather wide and deep. The outer lip is slightly expanded. The columellar margin is fairly straight. The siphonal canal is very short.

== Distribution ==
This species occurs in the Caribbean Sea off Cuba.
