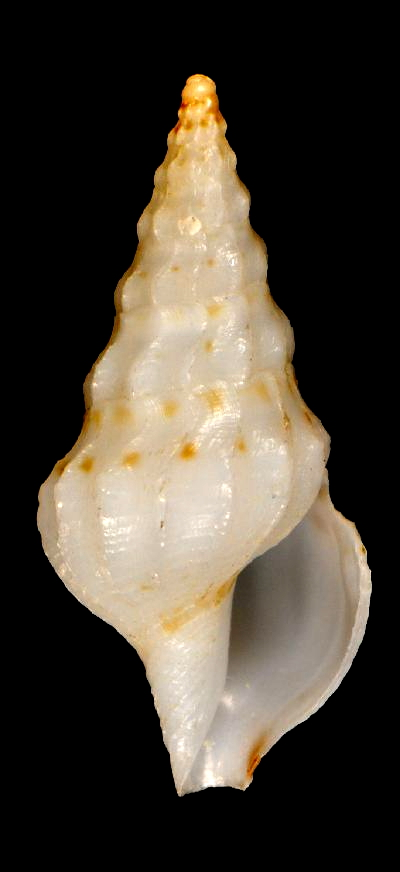
- Shell of Neodrillia blakensis (specimen at MNHN, Paris)

Scientific classification
- Kingdom: Animalia
- Phylum: Mollusca
- Class: Gastropoda
- Subclass: Caenogastropoda
- Order: Neogastropoda
- Superfamily: Conoidea
- Family: Drilliidae
- Genus: Neodrillia
- Species: N. blakensis

Binomial name
- Neodrillia blakensis (Tippett, 2007)

Synonyms
- Clathrodrillia blakensis (Tippett, 2007); Drillia blakensis Tippett, 2007 (original combination); Drillia (Clathrodrillia) blakensis Tippett, 2007

= Neodrillia blakensis =

Species of gastropod

Neodrillia blakensis is a species of sea snail, a marine gastropod mollusk in the family Drilliidae.

== Description ==
The length of the shell varies between 40 mm and 45 mm.

== Distribution ==
This species occurs in the western Atlantic Ocean off the Bahamas; also off Martinique.
