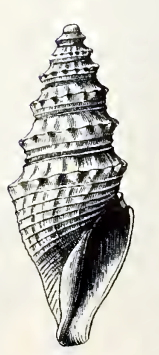
- Original image of a shell of Mangelia toreumata

Scientific classification
- Kingdom: Animalia
- Phylum: Mollusca
- Class: Gastropoda
- Subclass: Caenogastropoda
- Order: Neogastropoda
- Superfamily: Conoidea
- Family: Mangeliidae
- Genus: Mangelia
- Species: M. toreumata

Binomial name
- Mangelia toreumata (Dall, 1889)

Synonyms
- Mangilia toreumata Dall, 1889 (original description)

= Mangelia toreumata =

Species of gastropod

Mangelia toreumata is a species of sea snail, a marine gastropod mollusc in the family Mangeliidae.

== Description ==
The length of the shell attains 10.2 mm, its diameter 4 mm.

(Original description) The shell is seven-whorled. The protoconch is lost, the fragment of it remaining is smooth and colored like the rest of the shell, a pale straw color. The spiral sculpture consists of a large undulate thread, or continuous series of undulations, flat behind, sloping forward, sixteen or seventeen on the whorl next to the last. These give the whorl a turreted appearance. The spiral sculpture consists further of a strong simple thread revolving a short distance in front of the suture and forming the posterior margin of the fasciole. There are also a dozen or more similar threads on the body whorl, extending from the periphery, where the interspaces are wide, to the siphonal canal, where they are narrow. On the first three whorls of the spire none of these threads are visible. On the whorl next the last there are two between the suture and the shoulder of the whorl. The transverse sculpture consists of rather strong, even, irregularly spaced, concavely arched waves, which cross the fasciole from side to side like a succession of irregularly huddled parentheses; also of a few faint ridges on the base due to incremental irregularities. The base of the shell is subconic, slightly constricted for the siphonal canal. The anal notch is wide, squarely cut, rounded at the bottom, not touching the suture, a little deeper than wide. The outer lip is arched forward, thin, not lirate within. The inner lip is smooth and simple. The columella is straight. The siphonal canal is short, wide, very slightly recurved, leaving a fasciole behind the columella which is slightly obliquely trimmed off anteriorly. The aperture is long, narrow and shorter than the spire (described as Mangilia toreumata)

== Distribution ==
This marine species occurs off Dominica and Guadeloupe.
