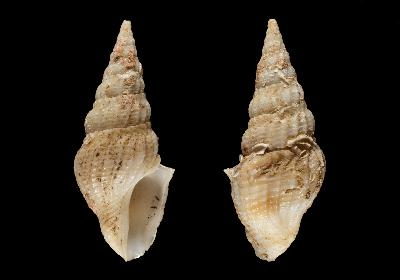
- Shell of Drillia connelli (paratype in the MNHN, Paris)

Scientific classification
- Kingdom: Animalia
- Phylum: Mollusca
- Class: Gastropoda
- Subclass: Caenogastropoda
- Order: Neogastropoda
- Superfamily: Conoidea
- Family: Drilliidae
- Genus: Drillia
- Species: D. connelli

Binomial name
- Drillia connelli (Kilburn, 1988)

Synonyms
- Clathrodrillia connelli (Kilburn, 1988)

= Drillia connelli =

Species of gastropod

Drillia connelli is a species of sea snail, a marine gastropod mollusk in the family Drilliidae.

== Distribution ==
This marine species occurs off Zululand, South Africa.
