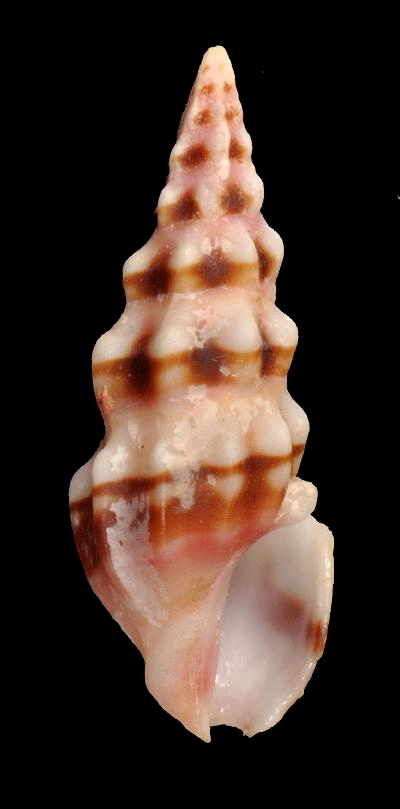
- Shell of Decoradrillia pulchella (specimen at MNHN, Paris)

Scientific classification
- Kingdom: Animalia
- Phylum: Mollusca
- Class: Gastropoda
- Subclass: Caenogastropoda
- Order: Neogastropoda
- Family: Drilliidae
- Genus: Decoradrillia
- Species: D. pulchella

Binomial name
- Decoradrillia pulchella (Reeve, 1845)

Synonyms
- Clavus (Tylotiella) pulchella (Reeve, 1845); Drillia pulchella Reeve, 1845; Fenimorea halidorema Schwengel, 1940; Pleurotoma angustae C. B. Adams, 1850; Pleurotoma pulchella Reeve, 1845; Splendrillia (Fenimorea) halidorema Abbott, 1974

= Decoradrillia pulchella =

Species of gastropod

Decoradrillia pulchella is a species of sea snail, a marine gastropod mollusk in the family Drilliidae.

== Description ==
The size of an adult shell varies between 14 mm and 25 mm. The pink shell has a chestnut band below the periphery, and a chestnut line, interrupted by the tubercles.

== Distribution ==
This species occurs in the demersal zone of the Caribbean Sea (Jamaica, Colombia) and the Gulf of Mexico; in the Atlantic Ocean from Florida to Northern Brazil at depths between 0 m and 100 m.
