= Bellaspira pentagonalis =

Scientific classification
- Kingdom: Animalia
- Phylum: Mollusca
- Class: Gastropoda
- Subclass: Caenogastropoda
- Order: Neogastropoda
- Superfamily: Conoidea
- Family: Drilliidae
- Genus: Bellaspira
- Species: B. pentagonalis

Binomial name
- Bellaspira pentagonalis (Dall, 1889)

Synonyms
- Bellaspira pentapleura Schwengel, J.S., 1940; Clathrodrillia pentagonalis Dall, 1889; Drillia pagodula var.pentagonalis Dall, 1889; Drillia pentagonalis Dall, 1889 (original combination); Fenimorea pagodula pentagonalis (Dall, 1889); Fenimorea pentapleura J.S. Schwengel, 1940

Species of gastropod

Bellaspira pentagonalis is a species of sea snail in the family Drilliidae.

== Description ==
The shell grows to a length of 10 mm.

The stout shell has a white tip. The whorls are whitish and the summits of the five ribs are brownish. The ribs are continuous from base to summit and the cross-section of the shell forms an exact pentagon with rounded angles. The ribs are not continuous, except accidentally. The other characters are closely similar to Fenimorea pagodula.

== Distribution ==
This marine species occurs from North Carolina (Cape Hatteras) to Florida, and in the Gulf of Mexico off Western Florida and in the Caribbean Sea off Aruba and French Guiana.
