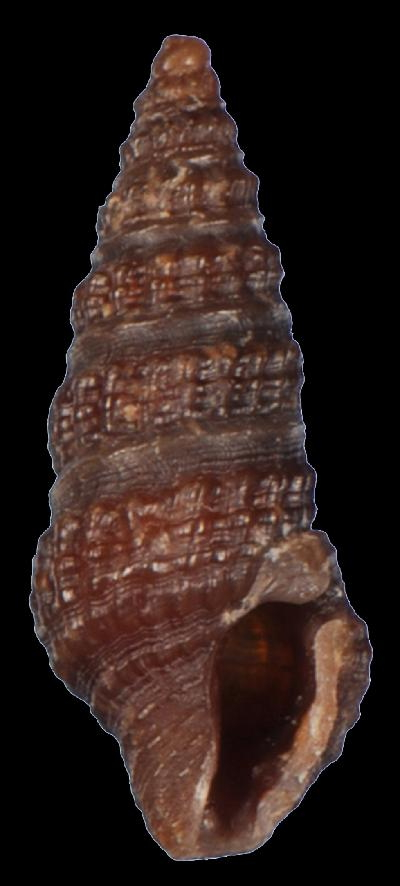
- Shell of Pyrgospira candace (specimen at MNHN, Paris)

Scientific classification
- Kingdom: Animalia
- Phylum: Mollusca
- Class: Gastropoda
- Subclass: Caenogastropoda
- Order: Neogastropoda
- Superfamily: Conoidea
- Family: Pseudomelatomidae
- Genus: Pyrgospira
- Species: P. candace

Binomial name
- Pyrgospira candace (Dall, 1919)

Synonyms
- Crassispira candace Dall, 1919

= Pyrgospira candace =

Species of gastropod

Pyrgospira candace is a species of sea snail, a marine gastropod mollusk in the family Pseudomelatomidae, the turrids and allies.

== Description ==
The size of the shell attains 7.5 mm, its diameter 3.5 mm.

(Original description) The small shell is pale purple with touches of brown. The protoconch is lost. The shell contains about seven subsequent short whorls. The suture is appressed, obscure, behind a moderately impressed anal fasciole with a fine thread between them. The other spiral sculpture consists of (on the spire) two peripheral close-set threads overriding the ribs. In front of these on the body whorl are two or three obscure broad flattish ridges with rather wide interspaces overridden by the axial sculpture, and on the siphonal canal a few rather sharp threads more closely set. The axial sculpture consists of 10 or more short ribs on the penultimate whorl with narrower interspaces. On the body whorl there are about 13 smaller ribs extending nearly to the siphonal canal and reticulating the spiral sculpture. The incremental lines are rather marked. The aperture is wide and short. The anal sulcus is large, rounded and shows a subsutural callus. The outer lip is thin-edged, prominent, with a large rounded varix behind it. Within it is dark brow and smooth. The inner lip is simple. The columella is very short and not callous. The siphonal canal is very short but distinct.

== Distribution ==
This species occurs in the Caribbean Sea and off the Lesser Antilles; in the Gulf of California, Western Mexico
