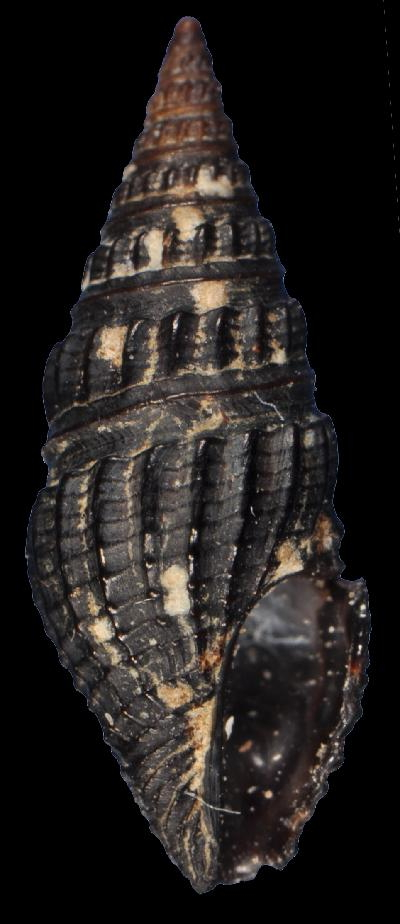
- Shell of Clathrodrillia solida (specimen at MNHN, Paris)

Scientific classification
- Kingdom: Animalia
- Phylum: Mollusca
- Class: Gastropoda
- Subclass: Caenogastropoda
- Order: Neogastropoda
- Superfamily: Conoidea
- Family: Drilliidae
- Genus: Clathrodrillia
- Species: C. solida

Binomial name
- Clathrodrillia solida (Adams C. B., 1850)

Synonyms
- Clathrodrillia ebenina auct. non Dall, 1890; Clathrodrillia solida C. B. Adams, 1850; Crassispira ebenina auct. non Dall, 1890; Crassispira fuscescens auct. non C. B. Adams, 1850; Crassispira solida (C. B. Adams, 1850); Drillia ebenina auct. non Dall, 1890; Drillia fuscescens Gray; Drillia solida (C. B. Adams, 1850); Pleurotoma solida Adams C. B., 1850; Strictispira solida (C. B. Adams, 1850)

= Clathrodrillia solida =

Species of gastropod

Clathrodrillia solida, common name the solid drillia, is a species of sea snail, a marine gastropod mollusk in the family Drilliidae.

== Description ==
The color of the shell is deep chocolate-brown. Its longitudinal ribs are separated by wider interspaces, crossed by revolving raised lines, forming granules. It is smooth and slightly concave above the periphery, with a raised line next the suture. The shell grows to a length of 19 mm.

== Distribution ==
This marine species occurs in the Caribbean Sea, the Gulf of Mexico and in the West Indies.
