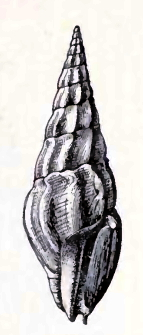
- Original image of a shell of Fenimorea moseri

Scientific classification
- Kingdom: Animalia
- Phylum: Mollusca
- Class: Gastropoda
- Subclass: Caenogastropoda
- Order: Neogastropoda
- Superfamily: Conoidea
- Family: Drilliidae
- Genus: Fenimorea
- Species: F. moseri

Binomial name
- Fenimorea moseri (Dall, 1889)

Synonyms
- Bellaspira brunnescens (Rehder, 1943); Drillia (Cymatosyrinx) moseri Dall, 1889 (basionym); Drillia blacki (Petuch, 2004); Drillia moseri Dall, 1889 (original combination); Fenimorea brunnescens Rehder, 1943; Fenimorea moseri brunnescens Rehder, 1943; Neodrillia blacki Petuch, 2004; Splendrillia moseri (Dall, 1889)

= Fenimorea moseri =

Species of gastropod

Fenimorea moseri is a species of sea snail, a marine gastropod mollusk in the family Drilliidae.

The subspecies Fenimorea moseri brunnescens Rehder, 1943 is accepted as Fenimorea moseri (Dall, 1889)

== Description ==
The length of the shell varies between 20 mm and 35 mm; its diameter 10 mm.

(Original description) The color of the shell varies from a rich rose color, with paler bands on the base, fasciole, etc., to yellowish white. The protoconch contains two whorls, followed by nine or ten subsequent whorls. The spiral sculpture consists of numerous very shallow grooves with wider flat interspaces. The grooves are cross-striated by close-set fine elevated incremental lines. This sculpture is very easily eroded and sometimes nearly absent. The transverse sculpture consists of about eleven strong wave-like ribs with wider interspaces, the crests rounded. These extend from the suture to the base, and are narrowed and curved like the top of an interrogation point when they pass over the fasciole. The fasciole is constricted rather than excavated, the grooving is closer and finer than on the rest of the shell, and if the shell is colored the fasciole is paler. The whorl is strongly appressed at the suture and a little undulated by the ribs. The aperture is rather narrow. The anal sulcus is large and rounded. The callus is thick and elevated. The columella is nearly straight. The siphonal canal is short, wide and turned to the right. The siphonal fasciole is strong. The varix is large and stout.

== Distribution ==
This species occurs in the demersal zone of the Gulf of Mexico; in the Atlantic Ocean off the Bahamas, North Carolina, the Florida Keys and Brazil.

This species was also found as a fossil in the strata of the Caloosahatchee Formation, Quaternary of Florida at North St Petersburg.
