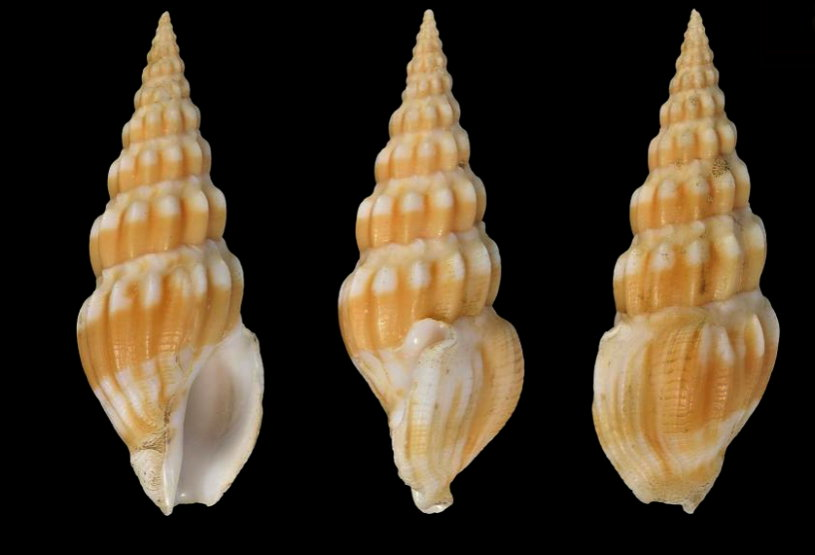
- Shell of Fenimorea janetae (holotype at the Smithsonian Institution)

Scientific classification
- Kingdom: Animalia
- Phylum: Mollusca
- Class: Gastropoda
- Subclass: Caenogastropoda
- Order: Neogastropoda
- Superfamily: Conoidea
- Family: Drilliidae
- Genus: Fenimorea
- Species: F. janetae

Binomial name
- Fenimorea janetae Bartsch, 1934

Synonyms
- Clavus (Fenimorea) janetae Wenz, 1943; Splendrillia (Fenimorea) janetae Abbott, 1974; Splendrillia (Syntomodrillia) janetae Vokes & Vokes, 1983

= Fenimorea janetae =

Species of gastropod

Fenimorea janetae, common name Janet's turrid, is a species of sea snail, a marine gastropod mollusk in the family Drilliidae.

== Description ==
The length of an adult shell varies between 25 mm and 40 mm; its diameter 14.3 mm.

(Original description) The shell is rather large, with the posterior groove and an area about as wide as this groove, anterior to the groove, on the axial ribs, white. This is followed by a broad zone of chestnut-brown occupying about half the whorls between the summit and suture. This zone terminates a little below the periphery. Anterior to this is a fainter thread of brown and a little paler brown area in the groove just posterior to the fasciole. In addition to this, there are, in the lighter bands in the intercostal spaces, indications of pale brown markings. The broad brown band becomes enfeebled on the last portion of the body whorl. The interior of the aperture is bluish white with the dark band shining partly through this, and the callus on the columellar area is porcelaneous. The protoconch contains 1.5 small whorls, well rounded and smooth. The postnuclear whorls are appressed at the summit with a depressed groove occupying the posterior third between the summit and suture, evenly rounded from the anterior termination of this to the periphery, and marked by strong, broad, rounded, axial ribs. These have their strongest development anterior to the sinus at the summit and become attenuated posteriorly in crossing the base, where they extend to the basal fasciole. Of these ribs, 10 are present on the first four whorls, 12 on the fifth to seventh, 14 on the eighth and ninth, and 16 on the tenth. The spaces separating the axial ribs are about as wide as the ribs. In addition to this sculpture the whorls are marked by slender spiral threads in the depressed area near the summit, of which II are present on the body whorl. Anterior to the depressed area the threads are replaced by pitted impressed lines, which also cover the base. Between the threads and lines, under high magnification, still finer, closely spaced, microscopic spiral striations are present, and the ribs and the intercostal spaces also bear fine incremental lines with microscopic axial incised lines between them. The heavier incremental lines terminating anteriorly in the spiral line of pits divide the space between the spiral lines into scalelike elements suggesting the scales of some butterfly wings, each scale being bordered by a deeper axial depression and marked by microscopic axial striations, as well as the microscopic spiral lines, the axial striations being a little stronger. The columella has a moderately strong basal fasciole, which is bordered posteriorly by three feeble spiral threads and crossed by two more, whereas anterior to the basal fasciole the columella bears aboutsix feebly impressed spiral threads. The aperture is moderately large, rather broad, slightly channeled anteriorly with the posterior channel deeply incised and its wall reflected as a strong callus over the parietal wall. The stromboid notch at the anterior end of the outer lip is rather short and shallow. The space between the stromboid notch and the basal channel is clawlike. The parietal wall is covered by a moderately thick callus. There is a stronger varix about a quarter of a turn behind the aperture on the body whorl.

== Distribution ==
This species occurs in the benthic zone of the Caribbean Sea, the Gulf of Mexico and Puerto Rico; in the Atlantic Ocean between Florida and Brazil. Taken by dredge and in traps at 500ft. depth: West coast of Barbados, Lesser Antilles.
