= Crockerella castianira =

Scientific classification
- Kingdom: Animalia
- Phylum: Mollusca
- Class: Gastropoda
- Subclass: Caenogastropoda
- Order: Neogastropoda
- Superfamily: Conoidea
- Family: Clathurellidae
- Genus: Crockerella
- Species: C. castianira

Binomial name
- Crockerella castianira (Dall, 1919)

Synonyms
- Clathrodrillia castianira Dall, 1919

Species of gastropod

Crockerella castianira is a species of sea snail, a marine gastropod mollusk in the family Clathurellidae, the cone snails and their allies.
