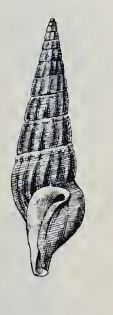
- Original image of a shell of Neodrillia albicoma

Scientific classification
- Kingdom: Animalia
- Phylum: Mollusca
- Class: Gastropoda
- Subclass: Caenogastropoda
- Order: Neogastropoda
- Superfamily: Conoidea
- Family: Drilliidae
- Genus: Neodrillia
- Species: N. albicoma

Binomial name
- Neodrillia albicoma (Dall, 1889)

Synonyms
- Clathrodrillia albicoma (Dall, 1889); Drillia albicoma Dall, 1889 (original combination); Leptadrillia albicoma (Dall, 1889)

= Neodrillia albicoma =

Species of gastropod

Neodrillia albicoma is a species of sea snail, a marine gastropod mollusk in the family Drilliidae.

== Description ==
The size of an adult shell varies between 18 mm and 34 mm.

(Original description) The solid, slender, acute shell is pure white. The simple polished protoconch contains 1½ whorls. It is followed by nine normal whorls. The spiral sculpture consists of extremely fine, close-set, regular threads, uniform over the entire surface, but scarcely visibly developed in the first four whorls, which appear polished to the naked eye. The threads on the body whorl are about nine in the breadth ol a millimeter. The transverse sculpture consists of rather stout, sharp ribs (on the seventh whorl ten) which extend from suture to suture, with a slight fiexuosity near the suture, but no marked interruption for a fasciole. On the body whorl there are fourteen of these ribs, beside the large shouldered varix behind the aperture. They extend well over the periphery of the whorl, and are evanescent on the siphonal canal. Other transverse sculpture comprises only fine lines of growth which are not parallel to but more oblique than the aforesaid ribs, and reticulate prettily the spiral threads. The whorls are but little inflated, having a very regular taper, slightly appressed at the distinct but not deep suture. The aperture is more than one third as long as the shell, polished within, with a deep broad notch, slightly in advance of the suture, whose edges are produced and considerably reflected. The fasciole is indistinct and little depressed. The outer lip is smooth, in the middle produced, internally somewhat thickened, not lirate. The siphonal canal is short, rather broad, and somewhat recurved. A broad, not very thick, continuous band of white callus from the end of the columella over the body passes into the reflected margin of the notch. The columella is slightly curved.

== Distribution ==
This species occurs in the Gulf of Mexico and in the Caribbean Sea; in the Atlantic Ocean along Eastern Brazil.
