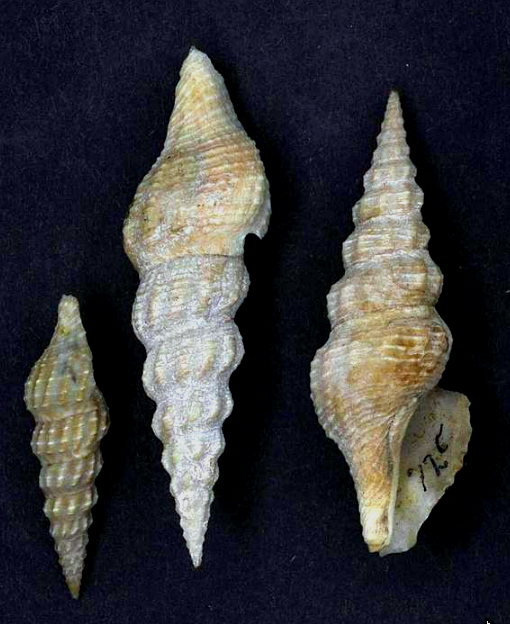
- Shells of Clathrodrillia flavidula (museum specimens at Naturalis Biodiversity Center)

Scientific classification
- Kingdom: Animalia
- Phylum: Mollusca
- Class: Gastropoda
- Subclass: Caenogastropoda
- Order: Neogastropoda
- Superfamily: Conoidea
- Family: Drilliidae
- Genus: Clathrodrillia
- Species: C. flavidula

Binomial name
- Clathrodrillia flavidula (Lamarck, 1822)

Synonyms
- Brachystoma flavidula Yen, T.C. 1942; Clathrodrillia flavidula (Lamarck, 1822); Clavatula flavidula (Lamarck, 1822); Clavus flavidulus (Lamarck, 1822); Clavus (Clathrodrillia) flavidulus (Lamarck, 1822); Drillia flavidula Lamarck, 1822; Drillia lanceolata (Reeve, 1845); Funa flavidula (Lamarck, 1822); Inquisitor flavidula [sic] (incorrect gender ending); Inquisitor flavidulus (Lamarck, 1822); Pleurotoma flavidula Lamarck, 1822; Ptychobela flavidula (Lamarck, 1822)

= Clathrodrillia flavidula =

Species of gastropod

Clathrodrillia flavidula, common name the javelin turrid, is a species of sea snail, a marine gastropod mollusk in the family Drilliidae.

== Description ==
The shell is rather thin, turreted, longitudinally obliquely ribbed and crossed by revolving lines. The color of the shell is yellowish white to brown, the lighter-colored specimens sometimes indistinctly broadly fasciated with brown. Its length is 65 mm and its diameter 20 mm.

== Distribution ==
This marine species is found in the Red Sea; off the Philippines, China and Japan; off Australia (Northern Territory, Queensland, Western Australia)
