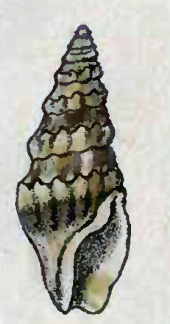
- Drawing of a shell of Fenimorea paria

Scientific classification
- Kingdom: Animalia
- Phylum: Mollusca
- Class: Gastropoda
- Subclass: Caenogastropoda
- Order: Neogastropoda
- Superfamily: Conoidea
- Family: Drilliidae
- Genus: Fenimorea
- Species: F. paria

Binomial name
- Fenimorea paria (Reeve, 1846)

Synonyms
- Clathrodrillia paria (Reeve, 1846); Drillia fucata Reeve, 1846; Drillia weldiana Tenison-Woods, J.E., 1876; Fenimorea fucata fucata (Reeve, 1846); Pleurotoma paria Reeve, 1846

= Fenimorea paria =

Species of gastropod

Fenimorea paria is a species of sea snail, a marine gastropod mollusk in the family Drilliidae.

This species is considered by WoRMS as a nomen dubium.

== Description ==
The size of an adult shell varies between 10 mm and 27 mm. The shell is obsoletely channeled above the periphery which is not prominently angulated. The longitudinal ribs are numerous, rounded, not prominent, not interrupted on the periphery but continuous to the suture, The shell is sometimes obsoletely spirally striated. The back of the body whorl has a peculiar hump or longitudinal varix. The shell is yellowish white, banded and maculated with yellowish or orange-brown.

== Distribution ==
This species occurs in the Atlantic Ocean off the Bahamas and from Florida to Brazil.
