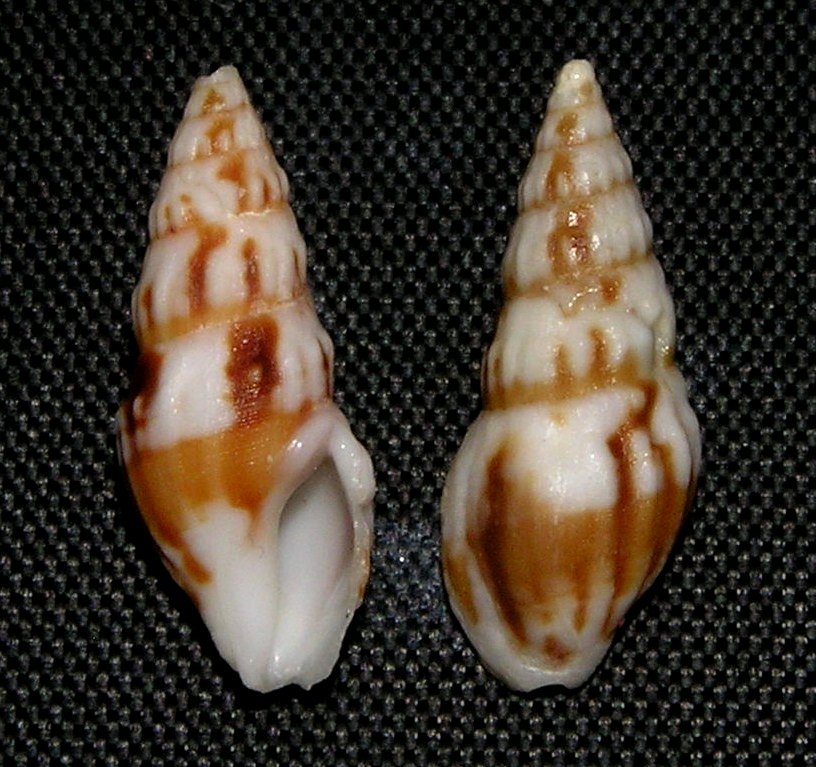
- Two views of a shell of Fenimorea fucata

Scientific classification
- Kingdom: Animalia
- Phylum: Mollusca
- Class: Gastropoda
- Subclass: Caenogastropoda
- Order: Neogastropoda
- Superfamily: Conoidea
- Family: Drilliidae
- Genus: Fenimorea
- Species: F. fucata

Binomial name
- Fenimorea fucata (Reeve, 1845)

Synonyms
- Cymatosyrinx fucata M. Smith, 1951 (spelled as furcata); Drillia fucata H. & A. Adams, 1853; Drillia (Tylotia) fucata Melvill, 1917; Drillia weldiana Tenison-Woods, J.E., 1876; Pleurotoma (Clavus) fucata G. B. Sowerby III, 1892; Pleurotoma fucata Reeve, 1845 (basionym); Pleurotoma paria Reeve, L.A., 1846; Pleurotoma (Crassispira) fucata Mörch, 1852; Splendrillia fucata Campbell et al., 1975; Splendrillia paria L.A. Reeve, 1846; Splendrillia weldiana J.E. Tenison-Woods, 1876; Splendrillia (Syntomodrillia) fucata Abbott, 1974

= Fenimorea fucata =

Species of gastropod

Fenimorea fucata is a species of sea snail, a marine gastropod mollusc in the family Drilliidae.

== Description ==
The size of an adult shell varies between 10 mm and 27 mm. The shell is obsoletely channeled above the periphery which is not prominently angulated. The longitudinal ribs are numerous, rounded, not prominent, not interrupted on the periphery but continuous to the suture. The shell is sometimes obsoletely spirally striated. The back of the body whorl has a peculiar hump or longitudinal varix. The shell is yellowish white, banded and maculated with yellowish or orange-brown.

== Distribution ==
This species occurs in the benthic zone of the Caribbean Sea, the Gulf of Mexico, the Lesser Antilles and Puerto Rico; in the Atlantic Ocean from the Bahamas to Brazil at depths between 6 mm and 45 m.

This species was also found as a fossil in the strata of the Caloosahatchee Formation, Quaternary of Florida at North St Petersburg
