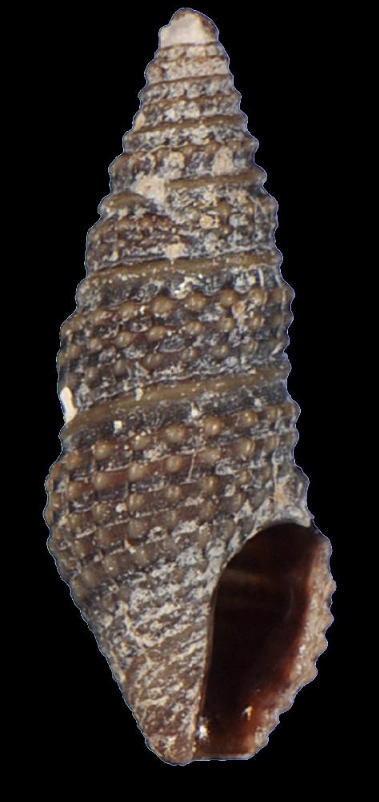
- Shell of Crassispira nigrescens (specimen in MNHN, Paris)

Scientific classification
- Kingdom: Animalia
- Phylum: Mollusca
- Class: Gastropoda
- Subclass: Caenogastropoda
- Order: Neogastropoda
- Superfamily: Conoidea
- Family: Pseudomelatomidae
- Genus: Crassispira
- Species: C. nigrescens

Binomial name
- Crassispira nigrescens (C. B. Adams, 1845)

Synonyms
- Pleurotoma nigrescens Adams C. B., 1845; Pyrgospira candace (Dall, 1919)

= Crassispira nigrescens =

Species of gastropod

Crassispira nigrescens is a species of small predatory sea snail, a marine gastropod mollusk in the family Pseudomelatomidae.

== Description ==
The length of the blackish, brown shell attains 8.5 mm. The shell contains 8 whorls, showing a beaded sculpture. The outer lip is very thick. The sinus is not very deep. The siphonal canal is very short.

== Distribution ==
This marine species occurs in the West Indies.
