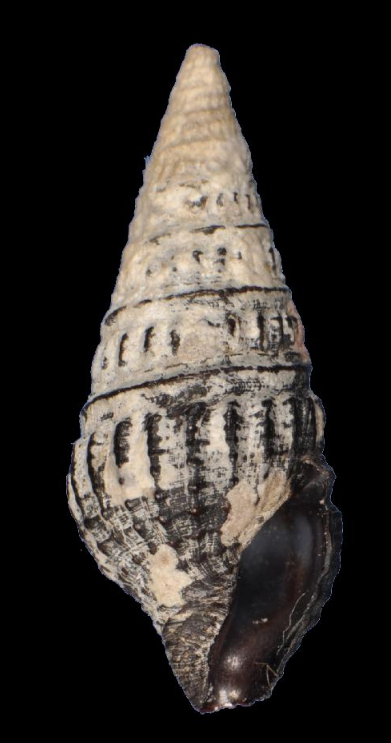
- Shell of Crassispira fuscescens (specimen at MNHN, Paris)

Scientific classification
- Kingdom: Animalia
- Phylum: Mollusca
- Class: Gastropoda
- Subclass: Caenogastropoda
- Order: Neogastropoda
- Superfamily: Conoidea
- Family: Pseudomelatomidae
- Genus: Crassispira
- Species: C. fuscescens

Binomial name
- Crassispira fuscescens (Reeve, 1843)

Synonyms
- Crassispira cuprea (Reeve, 1843); Pleurotoma cuprea Reeve, 1843; Pleurotoma fuscescens Reeve, 1843; Pyrgospira fuscescens (Reeve, 1843)

= Crassispira fuscescens =

Species of gastropod

Crassispira fuscescens is a species of sea snail, a marine gastropod mollusk in the family Pseudomelatomidae.

This species is similar to † Drillia fuscescens (Gray, 1843)

== Description ==
The length of the shell varies between 10 mm and 25 mm.

The color of the shell is deep chocolate-brown. The longitudinal ribs commence abruptly and are separated by wider interspaces, crossed by revolving raised lines, forming granules in the keel. The whorls above the periphery are smooth and slightly concave, with a raised line next the suture. The outer lip is thickened. with a sharp edge and a broad sinus.

== Distribution ==
This marine species occurs off the Florida Keys, United States, and from the West Indies to Brazil; fossils were found in Quaternary strata in Cuba; age range: 2.588 to 0.012 Ma
