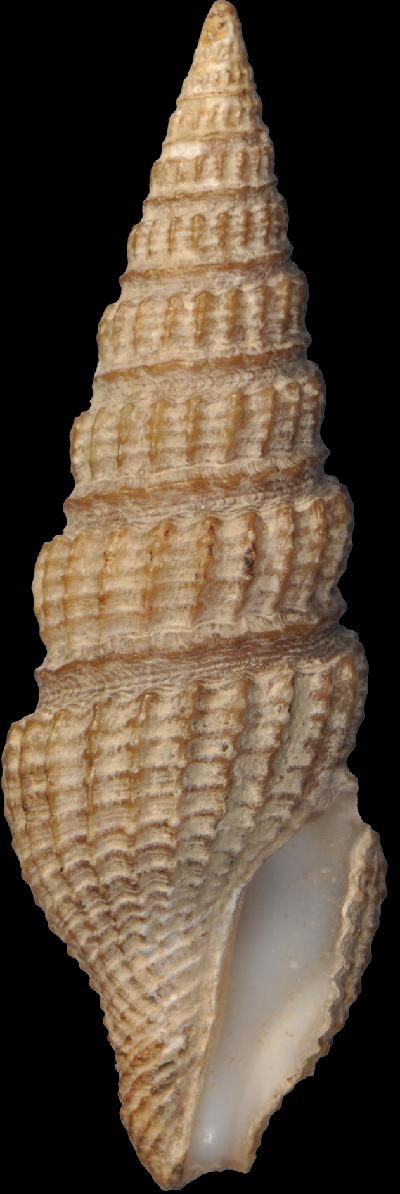
- Shell of Pyrgospira ostrearum (specimen at MNHN, Paris)

Scientific classification
- Kingdom: Animalia
- Phylum: Mollusca
- Class: Gastropoda
- Subclass: Caenogastropoda
- Order: Neogastropoda
- Superfamily: Conoidea
- Family: Pseudomelatomidae
- Genus: Pyrgospira
- Species: P. ostrearum

Binomial name
- Pyrgospira ostrearum (Stearns, 1872)

Synonyms
- Crassispira ostrearum (Stearns, 1872); Drillia ostrearum Stearns, 1872 (original combination)

= Pyrgospira ostrearum =

Species of gastropod

Pyrgospira ostrearum, common name the oyster turrid, is a species of sea snail, a marine gastropod mollusk in the family Pseudomelatomidae.

== Description ==
The size of the shell varies between 13 mm and 25 mm.

The shell is concavely, rather narrowly shouldered, with a thread-like raised line at the suture. It is closely longitudinally ribbed below the periphery and decussated by raised revolving lines. The color of the shell is dingy yellow to purplish black.

== Distribution ==
This species occurs in the Caribbean Sea, the Gulf of Mexico and off the Lesser Antilles; in the Atlantic Ocean from North Carolina, United States, to Eastern Brazil; fossils have been found in Quaternary strata in Florida, United States, and in Panama; age range: 1.806 to 0.781 MaMa.
