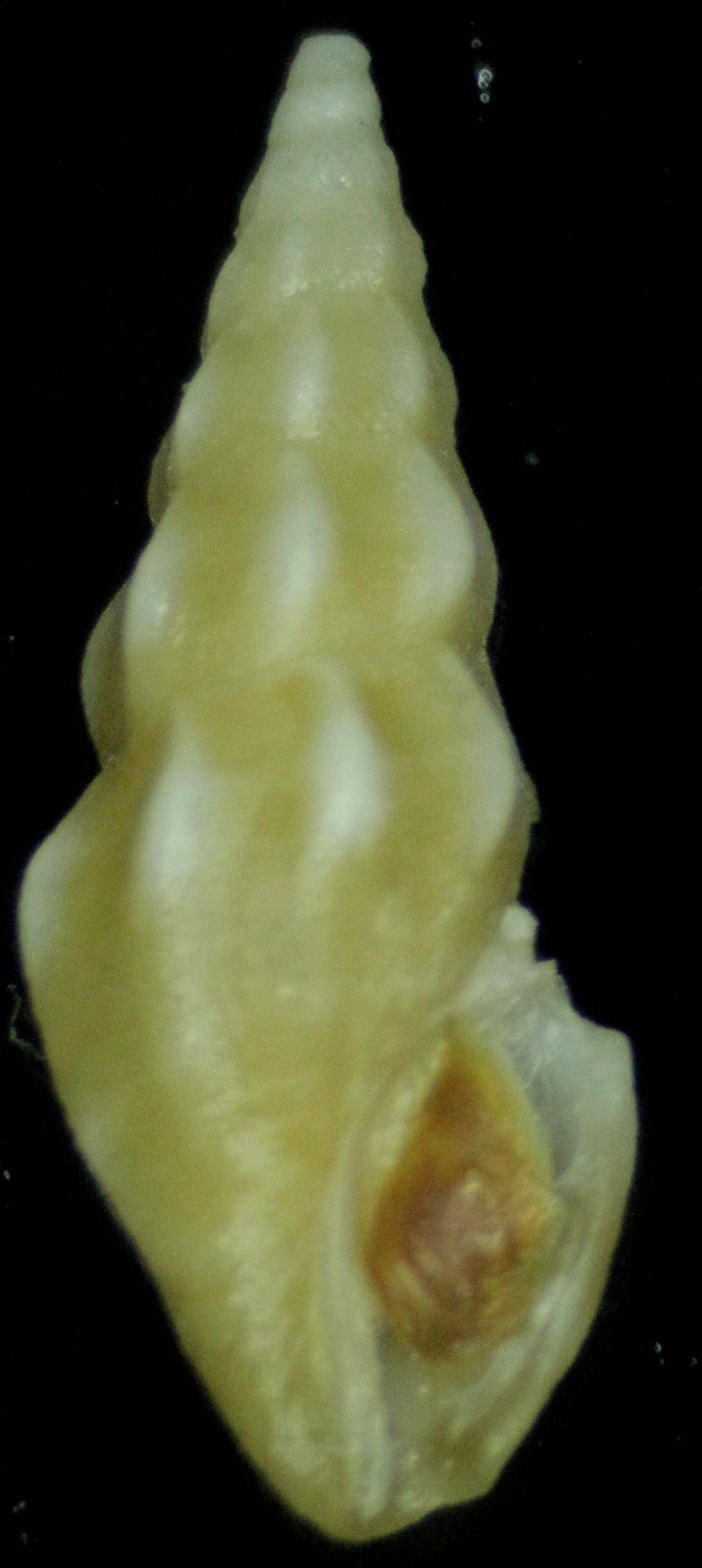
- Apertural view of a shell of Cerodrillia thea

Scientific classification
- Kingdom: Animalia
- Phylum: Mollusca
- Class: Gastropoda
- Subclass: Caenogastropoda
- Order: Neogastropoda
- Superfamily: Conoidea
- Family: Drilliidae
- Genus: Cerodrillia; Bartsch & Rehder, 1939

Type species
- Cerodrillia clappi Bartsch & Rehder, 1939

Species
- See text

Synonyms
- Drillia (Cerodrillia) Bartsch & Rehder, 1939

= Cerodrillia =

Genus of gastropods

Cerodrillia is a genus of sea snails, marine gastropod mollusks in the family Drilliidae.

== Species ==
Species within the genus Cerodrillia include:

- Cerodrillia ambigua Fallon, 2016
- Cerodrillia arubensis Fallon, 2016
- Cerodrillia asymmetrica McLean & Poorman, 1971
- Cerodrillia bahamensis (Bartsch, 1943)
- Cerodrillia brasiliensis Fallon, 2016
- Cerodrillia brunnea Fallon, 2016
- Cerodrillia carminura (Dall, 1889)
- Cerodrillia clappi Bartsch & Rehder, 1939
- Cerodrillia cratera (Dall, 1927)
- Cerodrillia cybele (Pilsbry & Lowe, 1932)
- Cerodrillia elegans Fallon, 2016
- Cerodrillia girardi Lyons, 1972
- Cerodrillia harryleei Fallon, 2016
- Cerodrillia jerrywallsi Poppe, Tagaro & Goto, 2018
- Cerodrillia minima Fallon, 2016
- Cerodrillia nicklesi (Knudsen, 1956)
- Cerodrillia occidua Fallon, 2016
- Cerodrillia perryae Bartsch & Rehder, 1939
- Cerodrillia porcellana Fallon, 2016
- Cerodrillia sanibelensis Fallon, 2016
- Cerodrillia thea (Dall, 1884)
- Cerodrillia yucatecana Fallon, 2016

Species brought into synonymy

- Cerodrillia abdera (Dall, 1919): synonym of Crassispira abdera (Dall, 1919)
- Cerodrillia bealiana (Schwengel & McGinty, 1942): synonym of Drillia bealiana (Schwengel & McGinty, 1942)
- Cerodrillia cervina (Bartsch, 1943): synonym of Viridrillia cervina Bartsch, 1943
- Cerodrillia coccinata (Reeve, 1845): synonym of Splendrillia coccinata (Reeve, 1845)
- Cerodrillia elissa (Dall, 1919): synonym of Leptadrillia elissa (Dall, 1919)
- Cerodrillia fuscocincta (C. B. Adams, 1850): synonym of Crassispira fuscocincta (C. B. Adams, 1850)
- Cerodrillia hannyae Jong & Coomans, 1988: synonym of Bellaspira hannyae (De Jong & Coomans, 1988)
- Cerodrillia interpunctata E.A. Smith, 1882: synonym of Splendrillia interpunctata (E. A. Smith, 1882)
- Cerodrillia laevisculpta H. von Maltzan, 1883: synonym of Splendrillia coccinata (L.A. Reeve, 1845)
- Cerodrillia schroederi Bartsch & Rehder, 1939: synonym of Lissodrillia schroederi (Bartsch & Rehder, 1939)
- Cerodrillia simpsoni (Simpson, 1886): synonym of Lissodrillia simpsoni (Dall, 1887)
- Cerodrillia verrillii (Dall, 1881): synonym of Lissodrillia verrillii (Dall, 1881)
- Cerodrillia williami (Bartsch, 1943): synonym of Viridrillia williami Bartsch, 1943
