= Splendrillia flavopunctata =

Scientific classification
- Kingdom: Animalia
- Phylum: Mollusca
- Class: Gastropoda
- Subclass: Caenogastropoda
- Order: Neogastropoda
- Superfamily: Conoidea
- Family: Drilliidae
- Genus: Splendrillia
- Species: S. flavopunctata

Binomial name
- Splendrillia flavopunctata Fallon, 2016

Species of gastropod

Splendrillia flavopunctata is a species of sea snail, a marine gastropod mollusk in the family Drilliidae.

== Description ==
The shell is small, glossy, and spindle-shaped, with a tall spire, reaching a length of up to 18.8 mm. It has up to 11 whorls, the body whorl making up about 54% of the total shell length. The whorls are convex, with the widest point below the middle of the whorl and a slight sag just above the suture. The aperture is narrow, only slightly wider at its midpoint than the anterior canal. The protoconch (larval shell) consists of about 2½ smooth, rounded whorls.

The axial sculpture consists of low, broad ribs with rounded crests, roughly as wide as the spaces between them, numbering 8–11 on the penultimate whorl and 7 on the body whorl. Spiral sculpture is largely absent, apart from a few fine threads on the shell base and near the anterior fasciole. A hump-like varix lies about a third of a turn back from the edge of the outer lip. The shell is white, marked with two light golden-brown bands running between the ribs above the suture, and the varix bears a reddish-brown patch. The species epithet, from Latin flavus ("gold-coloured") and punctatus ("spotted"), refers to these two rows of golden-brown spots.

Splendrillia flavopunctata closely resembles several other Caribbean species of Splendrillia — S. interpunctata, S. panamensis, S. abdita, and S. bahamasensis — but can be distinguished from each by its shell proportions, whorl convexity, or colour pattern.

== Distribution ==
This marine species occurs off Barbados and off the Netherlands Antilles (southeast Curaçao), at depths of about 155–274 m.
