= C. schroederi =

C. schroederi may refer to:

- Calliostoma schroederi, a sea snail species
- Cerodrillia schroederi, a sea snail species
- Cricosaurus schroederi, an extinct marine crocodyliform species
