= Splendrillia abdita =

Scientific classification
- Kingdom: Animalia
- Phylum: Mollusca
- Class: Gastropoda
- Subclass: Caenogastropoda
- Order: Neogastropoda
- Superfamily: Conoidea
- Family: Drilliidae
- Genus: Splendrillia
- Species: S. abdita

Binomial name
- Splendrillia abdita Fallon, 2016

Species of gastropod

Splendrillia abdita is a species of sea snail, a marine gastropod mollusk in the family Drilliidae.

== Description ==
The shell attains a length of 10 millimetres (0.39 in) and the shell's texture is fusiform, truncated anteriorly and glossy. It has eight convex whorls with a large last whorl that is gradually tapering which is approximately 60% of the shell's length; the sutures are appressed. The protoconch has 1¾ smooth round whorls but the first whorl is not immersed. The axial sculpture are broad convex ribs that run from sulcus to suture on spire whorls. The ribs are usually obsolete in the sulcus but slightly leaning backwards and knob-like below sulcus of the first two whorls and elongate below: ten on the penultimate and six on the last whorl to the varix. Microscopic growth striae are present on the shell. The varix is convex and higher and wider than any other nearby rib and it is hump-like, positioned about ⅓-height of the spire whorls but bare besides for a few ribs that extend to the suture. The holotype's outer lip is flattened from the varix but the lip has been regrown from the varix and broken off into paratypes and strengthening axial folds are present. The edge of the lip forms from a slow arc from the anal sinus to the anterior canal. The holotype that was studied on also had a stromboid notch that was obscured by damage. The anal sinus is a deep notch that adjoins the suture at its apex behind the parietal lobe. The edges are parallel to sightly convergent, the inner rim of the sinus is flared out. The inner lip is narrow and emarginated and erect at the anterior end of the canal but recumbent elsewhere with a low parietal lobe posteriorly The anterior canal is well defined: it was short, straight and open. The fasciole is not swollen. The color of the shell is off-white with faint golden spots in the sulcus corresponding to the rib intercoastal space. The color may be more vivid in fresher specimens but the specimens collected in this research are old and faded.

=== Common misidentifications ===
Splendrillia abdita is very similar to Splendrillia subtilis, Splendrillia panamensis, Splendrillia interpunctata and Splendrillia alticostata. The last whorl of S. abdita is more convex than S. substilis whose last whorl is more angular than convex. S. abdita is smaller than S. panamensis, has ribs that extend farther down the last whorl than S. panamensis and lacks a strong spout-like anus. S. abdita has longer and less oblique ribs than S. interpunctata. S. abdita has less angular ribs than S. alticostata.

== Etymology ==
Its specific name, abdita that means hidden or mysterious in Latin is given to this snail to reference all specimens of Splendrillia having hidden existence under other identifications in museum trays.

== Distribution ==
This species occurs in the Caribbean Sea off Barbados.
