= Cerodrillia carminura =

Scientific classification
- Kingdom: Animalia
- Phylum: Mollusca
- Class: Gastropoda
- Subclass: Caenogastropoda
- Order: Neogastropoda
- Superfamily: Conoidea
- Family: Drilliidae
- Genus: Cerodrillia
- Species: C. carminura

Binomial name
- Cerodrillia carminura (Dall, 1889)

Synonyms
- Cerodrillia thea carminura (Dall, 1889); Drillia thea var. carminura Dall, 1889

Species of gastropod

Cerodrillia carminura is a species of sea snail, a marine gastropod mollusk in the family Drilliidae.

== Description ==
The shell grows to a length of 12 mm, its diameter 4 mm.

The shell has seven whorls beside the protoconch. It is of a lemonade color. It shows nine ribs on the penultimate whorl, rather straighter than in the type Cerodrillia thea and less swollen on the periphery.

== Distribution ==
This marine species occurs in deep water in the Gulf of Mexico and off West Florida and Barbados.
