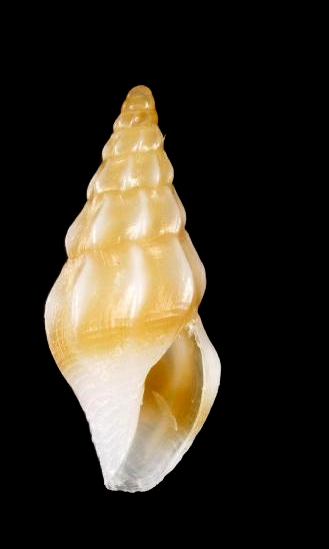
- Shell of Douglassia enae (specimen at MNHN, Paris)

Scientific classification
- Kingdom: Animalia
- Phylum: Mollusca
- Class: Gastropoda
- Subclass: Caenogastropoda
- Order: Neogastropoda
- Superfamily: Conoidea
- Family: Drilliidae
- Genus: Douglassia; Bartsch, 1934

Type species
- Douglassia enae Bartsch, 1934

Species
- See text

= Douglassia =

Genus of gastropods

Douglassia is a genus of sea snails, marine gastropod mollusks in the family Drilliidae.

== Description ==
(Original description) The shell is of medium size. The whorls in the protoconch are well rounded and smooth. The postnuclear whorls show a broad concave area immediately below the summit, across which the axial ribs do not extend. The rest are convex. The base of the shell is rather short. The columella is short and shows a feeble fasciole. The aperture is rather large, deeply channeled anteriorly and posteriorly, the posterior channel being immediately below the summit. The stromboid notch is conspicuously reflected. The columellar wall is reflected as a heavy callus. The parietal wall shows a heavy callus that forms a knob at the exterior angle. The sculpture consists of strong axial ribs that extend from the anterior limit of the concave area, where they are strongest over the base, growing feebler anteriorly. Fine incremental lines are also present on the ribs and in the intercostal spaces. The body of the whorls is marked by fine spiral lirations, while the columella has strong spiral cords.

== Species ==
Species within the genus Douglassia include:

- Douglassia antillensis Fallon, 2016
- Douglassia bealiana Schwengel & McGinty, 1942
- Douglassia curasub Fallon, 2016
- Douglassia enae Bartsch, 1934
- Douglassia minervaensis Fallon, 2016
- Douglassia moratensis Fallon, 2016

Species brought into synonymy

- Douglassia nodosa Nowell-Usticke, 1969: synonym of Splendrillia interpunctata (E. A. Smith, 1882)
