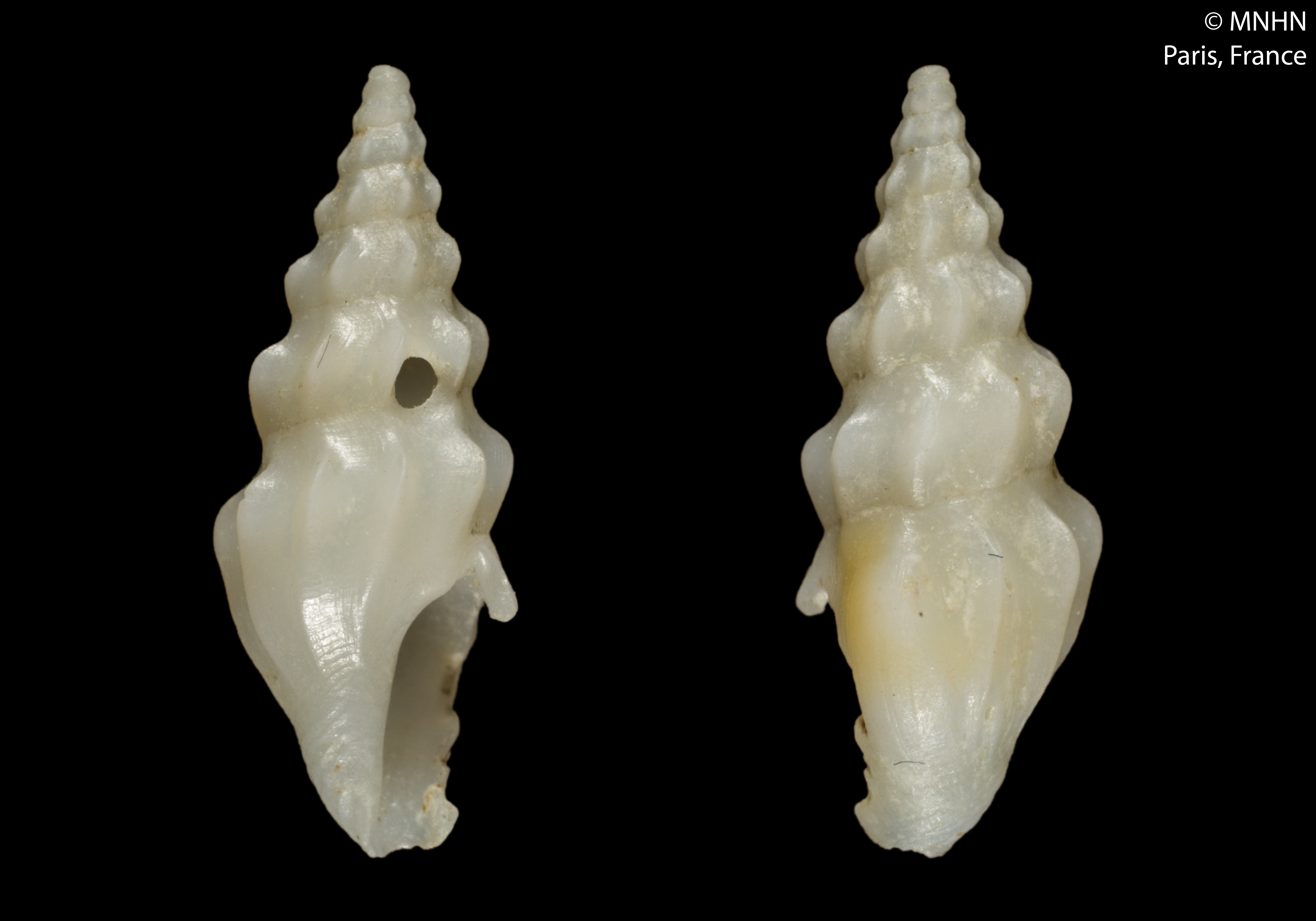
- Shell of Splendrillia alticostata (holotype at MNHN, Paris)

Scientific classification
- Kingdom: Animalia
- Phylum: Mollusca
- Class: Gastropoda
- Subclass: Caenogastropoda
- Order: Neogastropoda
- Superfamily: Conoidea
- Family: Drilliidae
- Genus: Splendrillia
- Species: S. alticostata

Binomial name
- Splendrillia alticostata Fallon, 2016

= Splendrillia alticostata =

Species of gastropod

Splendrillia alticostata is a species of sea snail, a marine gastropod mollusk in the family Drilliidae.

== Description ==
The length of the shell varies between 10 mm and 12 mm. The shell is fusiform, truncted anteriorly and glossy with about 8¼ convex whorls, the last whorl about 60% shell length. The suture is appressed and undulates over the axial ribs of the preceding whorl. The aperture is a narrow oval; The protoconch is of 1 7/8 smooth round whorls and the first one isn't immersed. The axial sculpture are high narrow ribs that run from suture to suture on the first 3 teleoconch whorls to sulcus on remaiing whorls. The ribs lower in the sulcal region on the first whorls are either mound-like, containing a cord-like trace or obsolete in the sulcus of later whorls. The ribs at the shoulder are almost wing-like, slightly leaning backwards and present in sulcus curved that the entire rib appears slightly sigimoid: 9 ribs on the penultimate, 6 on the last whorl to the varix. The ribs evanesce on shell base below the whorl periphery but are most absent in the sulcus. Growth striae are present on the shell but they are the most coarse on the dorsum of the last whorl. The varix is convex and higher than any nearby ribs, hump-like and positioned 1/4–1/3 of a turn from the edge of the outer lip. The spiral sculpture consists of 8 fine microscopic grooves or threads on the shell base and 5 stronger ridges on the anterior fasciole. The sulcus is narrow with lower ribs in early whorls that extend to the suture but mostly obsolete in following whorls but some of the ribs extend to the suture as curvy low cords that reflects the outline of the anal sulcus. The outer lip is usually missing on the mature holotypes. The anal sinus are shallow notch remains that joins the suture behind a low parietal lobe. The anterior half of the sinus is also missing in the holotype specimens. The inner lip is thin but unmarginate and it's erect at the end of the anterior canal with a low lobe posteriorly. The anterior canal is well defined: short, straight and open. The fasciole is not swollen. The color of the shell is white with a golden yellow patch on the shoulder or the leading side of the varix.

=== Common misconceptions ===
Splendrillia alticostata is very similar to Splendrillia interpunctata and Splendrillia panamensis. S. alticostata is different from S. panamensis because unlike S. panamensis, it doesn't have a spout-like anal sinus and it has a golden yellow patch on the varix as mentioned before. S. alticostata has a longer but less oblique ribs and longer but more tapered last whorl than S. interpunctata.

== Etymology ==
The species' name is "alticostata" because of its abnormal rib form. The name derives from Latin in which the adjective, altus which means "high", converted to its combining form "altus" with another Latin adjective costatus meaning ribbed and turned into its feminine form "costata".

== Distribution ==
This species occurs in the Caribbean Sea off Guadeloupe, Netherlands Antilles and Curaçao.
