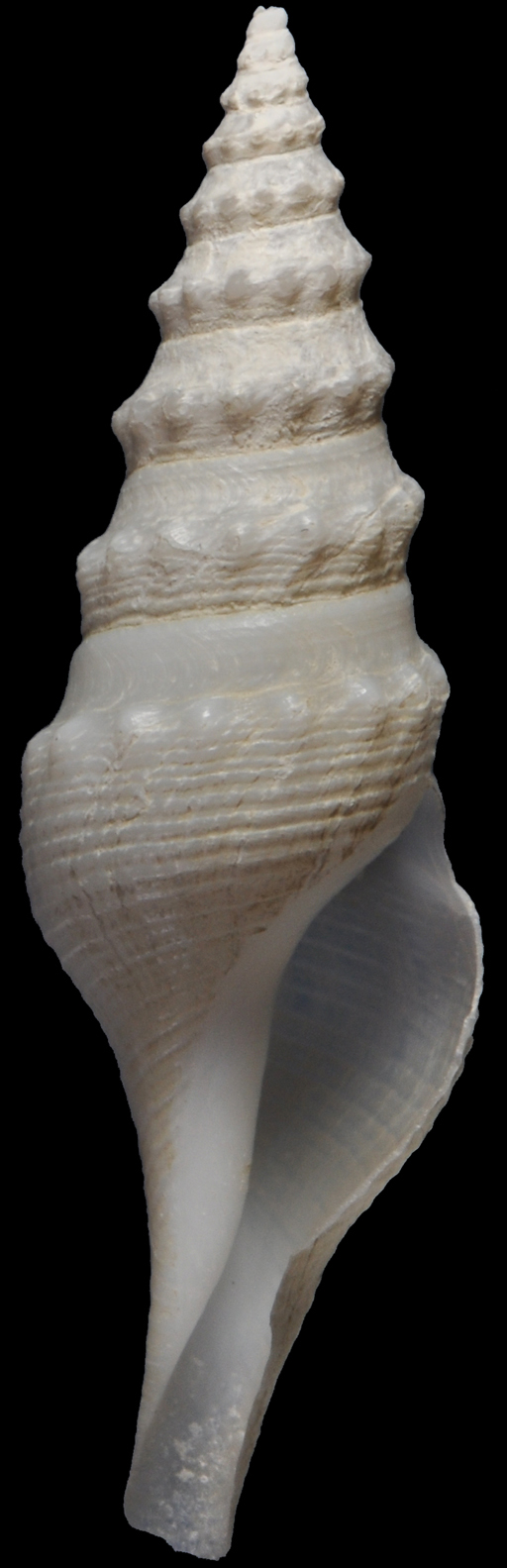
- Shell of Lissodrillia verrillii

Scientific classification
- Kingdom: Animalia
- Phylum: Mollusca
- Class: Gastropoda
- Subclass: Caenogastropoda
- Order: Neogastropoda
- Superfamily: Conoidea
- Family: Drilliidae
- Genus: Lissodrillia; Bartsch & Rehder, 1939

Type species
- Cerodrillia schroederi Bartsch & Rehder, 1939

Species
- See text

Synonyms
- Cerodrillia (Lissodrillia) Bartsch & Rehder, 1939 (original rank)

= Lissodrillia =

Genus of gastropods

Lissodrillia is a genus of sea snails, marine gastropod mollusks in the family Drilliidae.

This genus was previously considered a synonym of Cerodrillia Bartsch & Rehder, 1939. The only difference is the presence or absence of very fine spiral lirae.

== Species ==
Species within the genus Lissodrillia include:

- Lissodrillia arcas Fallon, 2016
- Lissodrillia cabofrioensis Fallon, 2016
- Lissodrillia ebur (Dall, 1927)
- Lissodrillia fasciata Fallon, 2016
- Lissodrillia lactea Fallon, 2016
- Lissodrillia levis Fallon, 2016
- Lissodrillia robusta Fallon, 2016
- Lissodrillia schroederi (Bartsch & Rehder, 1939)
- Lissodrillia simpsoni (Dall, 1887)
- Lissodrillia turgida Fallon, 2016
- Lissodrillia verrillii (Dall, 1881)
- Lissodrillia vitrea Fallon, 2016
