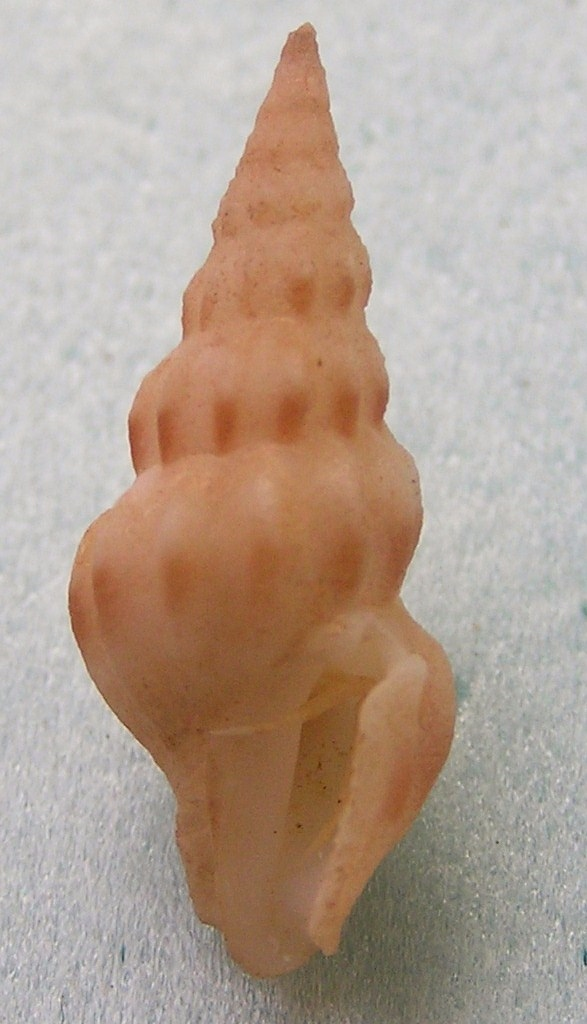
- Apertural view of Bellaspira acclivicosta

Scientific classification
- Kingdom: Animalia
- Phylum: Mollusca
- Class: Gastropoda
- Subclass: Caenogastropoda
- Order: Neogastropoda
- Superfamily: Conoidea
- Family: Drilliidae
- Genus: Bellaspira
- Species: B. acclivicosta

Binomial name
- Bellaspira acclivicosta McLean & L. Poorman, 1970

= Bellaspira acclivicosta =

Species of gastropod

Bellaspira acclivicosta is a species of sea snail, a marine gastropod mollusk in the family Drilliidae.

== Distribution ==
This species occurs in the Pacific Ocean off Mexico and Panama.
