= Douglassia moratensis =

Scientific classification
- Kingdom: Animalia
- Phylum: Mollusca
- Class: Gastropoda
- Subclass: Caenogastropoda
- Order: Neogastropoda
- Superfamily: Conoidea
- Family: Drilliidae
- Genus: Douglassia
- Species: D. moratensis

Binomial name
- Douglassia moratensis Fallon, 2016

Species of gastropod

Douglassia moratensis is a species of sea snail, a marine gastropod mollusc in the family Drilliidae.

== Description ==
=== External Shell and Structure ===
The size of an adult shell varies between 10mm and 14mm. Specimen photos show D. moratensis as fusiform with 8-9 whorls on the teleoconch and a high spire. The whorls are convex and rounded with strong axial ribs. The shell is primarily a caramel brown color with spiral bands of white, with the aperture lip and anterior half of the body whorl solidly white. The aperture has a short siphonal canal and is oblong with a wide posterior sinus. D. moratensis has a corneous operculum.

=== Live Snail ===
Species in the family Drilliidae have a radula that has five teeth in each row. The center row has a vestigial central tooth, the two medial rows have comb-like teeth, and the marginal rows have slender teeth. Drilliidae species possess a venom gland. D. moratensis has lens eyes.

== Distribution ==
This species occurs in the demersal zone of the Caribbean Sea off Honduras. Only two known specimens have been found as of 2026, with depths listed at approximately 20 meters below the surface, in the benthic zone.

== Life Habits ==
=== Diet ===
D. moratensis are carnivorous predators. Drilliidae species feed primarily on polychaetes.

=== Reproduction ===
D. moratensis reproduces sexually.

=== Locomotion ===
This species moves by mucus mediated gliding.
