= Cerodrillia cratera =

Scientific classification
- Kingdom: Animalia
- Phylum: Mollusca
- Class: Gastropoda
- Subclass: Caenogastropoda
- Order: Neogastropoda
- Superfamily: Conoidea
- Family: Drilliidae
- Genus: Cerodrillia
- Species: C. cratera

Binomial name
- Cerodrillia cratera (Dall, 1927)

Synonyms
- Mangilia cratera Dall, 1927 (original combination); Mangelia cratera (Dall, 1927)

Species of gastropod

Cerodrillia cratera is a species of sea snail, a marine gastropod mollusk in the family Drilliidae.

== Description ==
The shell grows to a length of 8.5 mm, its diameter 4 mm.

(Original description) The small, white shell is solid and nearly smooth. It has a large smooth protoconch of about two whorls and four and a half subsequent whorls. The suture is distinct, not appressed, the fasciole in front of it obscure, not constricted. The only sculpture on typical specimens consists of feeble incremental lines. There are faint indications of ribbing on some of the worn specimens which may belong to this species. The whorls are well rounded and rather rapidly increase in diameter. The aperture is ample. The anal sulcus is wide and shallow. The outer lip is slightly thickened and inflected. The siphonal canal is wide and hardly differentiated. The columella is short and strong, the axis impervious.

== Distribution ==
This species occurs in the Atlantic Ocean offshore from Georgia to Florida (US) at depths between 538 m and 805 m.
