= Lissodrillia fasciata =

Scientific classification
- Kingdom: Animalia
- Phylum: Mollusca
- Class: Gastropoda
- Subclass: Caenogastropoda
- Order: Neogastropoda
- Superfamily: Conoidea
- Family: Drilliidae
- Genus: Lissodrillia
- Species: L. fasciata

Binomial name
- Lissodrillia fasciata Fallon, 2016

Species of gastropod

Lissodrillia fasciata is a species of sea snail, a marine gastropod mollusc in the family Drilliidae.

== Description ==
The length of the shell attains 16 mm.

== Distribution ==
This species occurs in the Atlantic Ocean off the Canopus Bank, Ceará, Brazil.
