= Bellaspira virginiana =

- Original image of a shell of Bellaspira virginiana

Scientific classification
- Kingdom: Animalia
- Phylum: Mollusca
- Class: Gastropoda
- Subclass: Caenogastropoda
- Order: Neogastropoda
- Superfamily: Conoidea
- Family: Drilliidae
- Genus: Bellaspira
- Species: B. virginiana

Binomial name
- Bellaspira virginiana (Conrad, 1862)

Synonyms
- † Mangelia virginiana Conrad, 1862

Extinct species of gastropod

Bellaspira virginiana is an extinct species of sea snail, a marine gastropod mollusk in the family Drilliidae.

== Description ==
The length of the shell attains 14 mm. The shell is subfusiform and is longitudinally ribbed. The eight ribs are distant. The shell shows very minute, close revolving lines, which become gradually more distinct on the body whorl. The siphonal canal is very short. The simple and entire outer lip is obsoletely, widely notched and curved outwards. The lip is reflexed and slightly callous near the upper extremity. The columella is straight.

== Distribution ==
This extinct species was found in Miocene strata off Yorktown, Virginia, USA.
