= Viridrillia =

Scientific classification
- Kingdom: Animalia
- Phylum: Mollusca
- Class: Gastropoda
- Subclass: Caenogastropoda
- Order: Neogastropoda
- Superfamily: Conoidea
- Family: Pseudomelatomidae
- Genus: Viridrillia; Bartsch, 1943

Type species
- Viridrillia williami Bartsch, 1943

Species
- See text

Genus of gastropods

Viridrillia is a genus of sea snails, marine gastropod mollusks in the family Pseudomelatomidae.

== Species ==
Species within the genus Viridrillia include:

- Viridrillia aureofasciata García, 2008
- Viridrillia cervina Bartsch, 1943
- Viridrillia hendersoni Bartsch, 1943
- Viridrillia williami Bartsch, 1943
