= Douglassia curasub =

Scientific classification
- Kingdom: Animalia
- Phylum: Mollusca
- Class: Gastropoda
- Subclass: Caenogastropoda
- Order: Neogastropoda
- Superfamily: Conoidea
- Family: Drilliidae
- Genus: Douglassia
- Species: D. curasub

Binomial name
- Douglassia curasub Fallon, 2016

Species of gastropod

Douglassia curasub is a species of sea snail, a marine gastropod mollusc in the family Drilliidae.

== Description ==
An adult shell attains the size of 10 mm.

== Distribution ==
This species occurs in the demersal zone of the Caribbean Sea off Curaçao.
