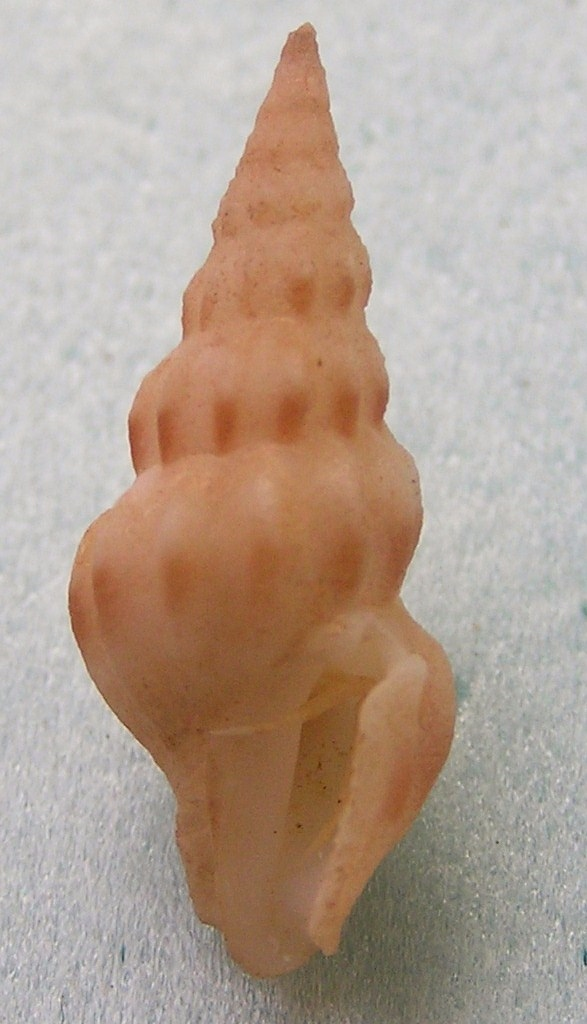
- Apertural view of Bellaspira acclivicosta

Scientific classification
- Kingdom: Animalia
- Phylum: Mollusca
- Class: Gastropoda
- Subclass: Caenogastropoda
- Order: Neogastropoda
- Superfamily: Conoidea
- Family: Drilliidae
- Genus: Bellaspira; Conrad, 1868

Type species
- † Mangelia virginiana Conrad, 1862

Species
- See text

= Bellaspira =

Genus of gastropods

Bellaspira is a genus of sea snails, marine gastropod mollusks in the family Drilliidae.

== Description ==
(Original description) The shell is subfusiform and is longitudinally ribbed. The siphonal canal is very short. The simple outer lip is obsoletely, widely notched and curved outwards. The lip is reflexed and entire. The columella is straight.

== Distribution ==
The species in this genus are found in the Caribbean Sea and in the western Atlantic Ocean.

== Species ==
Species within the genus Bellaspira include:

- Bellaspira acclivicosta McLean & L. Poorman, 1970
- Bellaspira amplicostata Fallon, 2016
- Bellaspira aurantiaca Fallon, 2016
- Bellaspira barbadensis Fallon, 2016
- Bellaspira clarionensis McLean & L. Poorman, 1970
- Bellaspira grippi (Dall, 1908)
- Bellaspira hannyae (De Jong & Coomans, 1988)
- Bellaspira margaritensis McLean & L. Poorman, 1970
- Bellaspira melea Dall, 1919
- Bellaspira minutissima Fallon, 2016
- Bellaspira pentagonalis (Dall, 1889)
- Bellaspira rosea Fallon, 2016
- Bellaspira stahlschmidti Fallon, 2016
- Bellaspira tricolor Fallon, 2016
- † Bellaspira virginiana (Conrad, 1862)

Species brought into synonymy

- Bellaspira brunnescens (Rehder, 1943): synonym of Fenimorea moseri (Dall, 1889)
- Bellaspira grimaldii (Dautzenberg, 1889): synonym of Amphissa acutecostata (Philippi, 1844)
- Bellaspira pentapleura Schwengel, 1940: synonym of Bellaspira pentagonalis (Dall, 1889)
- Bellaspira rigida (Reeve, 1846): synonym of Haedropleura septangularis (Montagu, 1803)
- Bellaspira rufa (Montagu, 1803): synonym of Propebela rufa (Montagu, 1803)
- Bellaspira septangularis (Montagu, 1803) synonym of Haedropleura septangularis (Montagu, 1803)
