= Bellaspira rosea =

Scientific classification
- Kingdom: Animalia
- Phylum: Mollusca
- Class: Gastropoda
- Subclass: Caenogastropoda
- Order: Neogastropoda
- Superfamily: Conoidea
- Family: Drilliidae
- Genus: Bellaspira
- Species: B. rosea

Binomial name
- Bellaspira rosea Fallon, 2016

Species of gastropod

Bellaspira rosea is a species of sea snail, a marine gastropod mollusc in the family Drilliidae.

== Description ==
The size of an adult shell varies between 7 mm and 14 mm.

== Distribution ==
This species occurs in the Atlantic Ocean off Espírito Santo, Brazil.
