= Douglassia minervaensis =

Scientific classification
- Kingdom: Animalia
- Phylum: Mollusca
- Class: Gastropoda
- Subclass: Caenogastropoda
- Order: Neogastropoda
- Superfamily: Conoidea
- Family: Drilliidae
- Genus: Douglassia
- Species: D. minervaensis

Binomial name
- Douglassia minervaensis Fallon, 2016

Species of gastropod

Douglassia minervaensis is a species of sea snail, a marine gastropod mollusc in the family Drilliidae.

== Etymology ==
The Douglassia minervaensis, is named after its type and the place of its only known occurrence, the Minerva Seamount.

== Description ==
The size of an adult shell attains 7.5 mm.

The shell is very small, reaching up to 7.9 mm total length, glossy, and fusiform with a truncated anterior. It has up to 8½ whorls; the last is large (about 59% of total length) and asymmetric, the right side is swollen by a cup-handle-like varix positioned behind the anal sinus about one-quarter turn from the outer lip, giving a lopsided ventral view. The protoconch consists of about 2¾ smooth whorls, the first partly immersed in the second. Early teleoconch whorls bear broad, low ribs; the last two carry high, narrow ribs. On the last whorl, bold axial ribs extend to the anterior fasciole but are strongly reduced or absent within a narrow, concave sulcus. Ribs are narrower than the interspaces, number 7–8 on the penultimate whorl and 6 on the last to the varix, and have acute crests. Growth striae are microscopic. The sulcus is concave and narrow, with broad, low rib remnants to the suture and recurved striae reflecting the anal sinus.

The spiral sculpture consists of 6–8 faint threads on the shell base and 6–8 faint threads on the anterior fasciole. The outer lip is thin, projects slightly, and is mostly missing in the holotype; a stromboid notch is unknown. The anal sinus lies on the whorl shoulder and has a rounded apex. The inner lip is moderately wide, margined, thicker anteriorly, thinnest on the parietal wall, and forms a posterior lobe at the anal sinus. The anterior canal is straight, short, and open, without a notch; the anterior fasciole is not swollen. The Colour of the Douglassia minervaensis is a uniform light golden brown with a lighter, narrow peripheral spiral band, and white on the rib-shoulder crests.

== Distribution ==
This species occurs in the demersal zone of the Western Atlantic Ocean off Bahia, Brazil.

== Bibliography ==
- Fallon, P.J. (2016). "Taxonomic review of tropical western Atlantic shallow water Drilliidae (Mollusca: Gastropoda: Conoidea) including descriptions of 100 new species". Zootaxa. 4090 (1): 1–363. doi:10.11646/zootaxa.4090.1.1. PMID 27394363.
