= Lissodrillia robusta =

Scientific classification
- Kingdom: Animalia
- Phylum: Mollusca
- Class: Gastropoda
- Subclass: Caenogastropoda
- Order: Neogastropoda
- Superfamily: Conoidea
- Family: Drilliidae
- Genus: Lissodrillia
- Species: L. robusta

Binomial name
- Lissodrillia robusta Fallon, 2016

Species of gastropod

Lissodrillia robusta is a species of sea snail, a marine gastropod mollusc in the family Drilliidae.

== Description ==
The length of the shell varies between 3.9 mm and 5.4 mm.

== Distribution ==
This species occurs in the Gulf of Mexico off Florida, Alabama and Mississippi; in the Atlantic Ocean off the Florida Keys.
