= Lissodrillia turgida =

Scientific classification
- Kingdom: Animalia
- Phylum: Mollusca
- Class: Gastropoda
- Subclass: Caenogastropoda
- Order: Neogastropoda
- Superfamily: Conoidea
- Family: Drilliidae
- Genus: Lissodrillia
- Species: L. turgida

Binomial name
- Lissodrillia turgida Fallon, 2016

Species of gastropod

Lissodrillia turgida is a species of sea snail, a marine gastropod mollusc in the family Drilliidae.

== Description ==
The length of the shell varies largely, ranging between 4 mm and 12 mm.

== Distribution ==
This species occurs in the Atlantic Ocean off the Florida Keys.
