= Lissodrillia ebur =

Scientific classification
- Kingdom: Animalia
- Phylum: Mollusca
- Class: Gastropoda
- Subclass: Caenogastropoda
- Order: Neogastropoda
- Superfamily: Conoidea
- Family: Drilliidae
- Genus: Lissodrillia
- Species: L. ebur

Binomial name
- Lissodrillia ebur (Dall, 1927)

Synonyms
- Cymatosyrinx ebur Dall, 1927 (original combination)

Species of gastropod

Lissodrillia ebur is a species of sea snail, a marine gastropod mollusk in the family Drilliidae.

== Description ==
The length of the shell varies between 4.5 mm and 8.5 mm.

(Original description) The small, white, solid shell has a swollen protoconch consisting of 1½ whorl and 5½ subsequent whorls. The suture is distinct, not appressed, with a slightly constricted fasciole in front of it. The axial sculpture consists of (on the body whorl 10-11) rounded fiexuous smooth ribs, most prominent at the periphery on the spire, sigmoidly flexed on the body whorl and absent from the base; the interspaces are equal or wider than the ribs. There is no spiral sculpture. The aperture is wide, measuring less than a third of the whole length. The anal sulcus is wide and deep. The outer lip is very prominently protractively arcuate. The columella is short. The siphonal canal is short and wide. The axis is not pervious.

== Distribution ==
This species occurs in the Atlantic Ocean off Florida, Georgia and South Carolina, United States, and in the Caribbean Sea off Cuba.
