= Cerodrillia ambigua =

Scientific classification
- Kingdom: Animalia
- Phylum: Mollusca
- Class: Gastropoda
- Subclass: Caenogastropoda
- Order: Neogastropoda
- Superfamily: Conoidea
- Family: Drilliidae
- Genus: Cerodrillia
- Species: C. ambigua

Binomial name
- Cerodrillia ambigua Fallon, 2016

Species of gastropod

Cerodrillia ambigua is a species of sea snail, a marine gastropod mollusc in the family Drilliidae.

== Description ==
The length of the shell varies between 5 mm and 12 mm.

== Distribution ==
This marine species occurs off Florida.
