= Cerodrillia cybele =

Scientific classification
- Kingdom: Animalia
- Phylum: Mollusca
- Class: Gastropoda
- Subclass: Caenogastropoda
- Order: Neogastropoda
- Superfamily: Conoidea
- Family: Drilliidae
- Genus: Cerodrillia
- Species: C. cybele

Binomial name
- Cerodrillia cybele (Pilsbry & Lowe, 1932)

Synonyms
- Splendrillia (Syntomodrillia) cybele Pilsbry & Lowe, 1932; Syntomodrillia cybele Pilsbry & Lowe, 1932

Species of gastropod

Cerodrillia cybele is a species of sea snail, a marine gastropod mollusk in the family Drilliidae.

== Description ==
The size of an adult shell varies between 9 mm and 12 mm.

== Distribution ==
This species occurs in the Pacific Ocean between Mexico and Panama.
