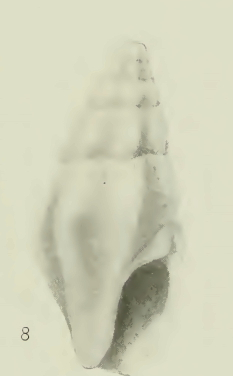
- Original image of a shell of Bellaspira melea

Scientific classification
- Kingdom: Animalia
- Phylum: Mollusca
- Class: Gastropoda
- Subclass: Caenogastropoda
- Order: Neogastropoda
- Superfamily: Conoidea
- Family: Drilliidae
- Genus: Bellaspira
- Species: B. melea

Binomial name
- Bellaspira melea Dall, 1919

Synonyms
- Cymatosyrinx melea Dall, 1919

= Bellaspira melea =

Species of gastropod

Bellaspira melea is a species of sea snail, a marine gastropod mollusk in the family Drilliidae.

== Description ==
The size of an adult shell varies between 12 mm and 20 mm.

(Original description) The stout shell has a rose pink color, with a whitish band in front of the suture. The blunt smooth protoconch contains about one whorl. The teleoconch contains the five subsequent whorls. The suture is appressed and obscure. The spiral sculpture is apparently absent. The axial sculpture shows (on the body whorl six) strong, stout, wavelike ribs, continuous up the spire, with wide interspaces, and practically vertical0 The surface appears to be smooth but as the specimen is slightly beach worn some minute sculpture may have disappeared. The suture is undulated by the ribs, there is no anal fasciole perceptible. The anal sulcus is narrow, short, with a subsutural callus in front of it. The outer lip is thin, sharp, with a marked varicose swelling behind it. There are no internal lirae. The inner lip is callous. The smooth columella is very short, stout, and straight. The siphonal canal is hardly differentiated from the aperture but deeply cut.

== Distribution ==
This species occurs in the Pacific Ocean off Panama.
