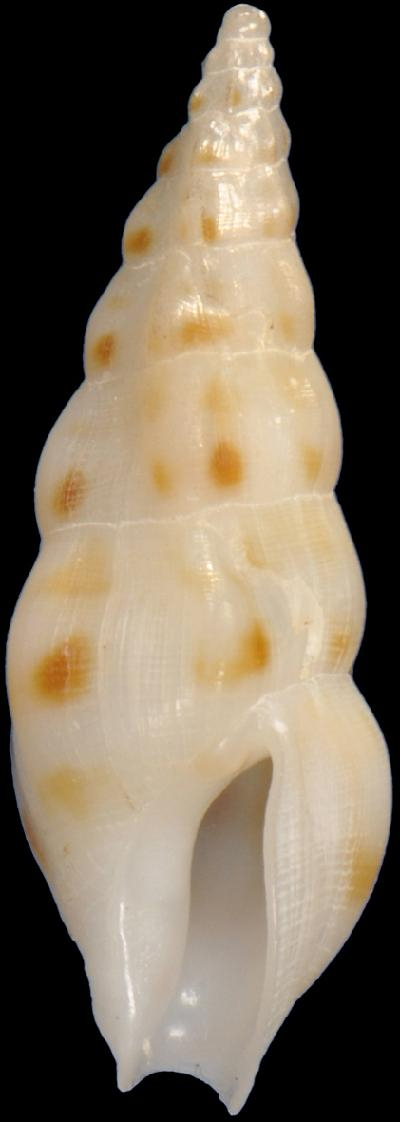
- Shell of Bellaspira barbadensis (specimen at MNHN, Paris)

Scientific classification
- Kingdom: Animalia
- Phylum: Mollusca
- Class: Gastropoda
- Subclass: Caenogastropoda
- Order: Neogastropoda
- Superfamily: Conoidea
- Family: Drilliidae
- Genus: Bellaspira
- Species: B. barbadensis

Binomial name
- Bellaspira barbadensis Fallon, 2016

= Bellaspira barbadensis =

Species of gastropod

Bellaspira barbadensis is a species of sea snail, a marine gastropod mollusc in the family Drilliidae.

== Description ==
The length of an adult shell varies between 6 mm and 15 mm.

== Distribution ==
This species occurs in the Caribbean Sea off Barbados, the Netherlands Antilles, and Venezuela.
