= Cerodrillia occidua =

Scientific classification
- Kingdom: Animalia
- Phylum: Mollusca
- Class: Gastropoda
- Subclass: Caenogastropoda
- Order: Neogastropoda
- Superfamily: Conoidea
- Family: Drilliidae
- Genus: Cerodrillia
- Species: C. occidua

Binomial name
- Cerodrillia occidua Fallon, 2016

Species of gastropod

Cerodrillia occidua is a species of sea snail, a marine gastropod mollusc in the family Drilliidae.

== Description ==
The length of the shell varies between 8.5 mm and 14 mm.

== Distribution ==
This marine species occurs off the Campeche Bank, Mexico.
