= Bellaspira amplicostata =

Scientific classification
- Kingdom: Animalia
- Phylum: Mollusca
- Class: Gastropoda
- Subclass: Caenogastropoda
- Order: Neogastropoda
- Superfamily: Conoidea
- Family: Drilliidae
- Genus: Bellaspira
- Species: B. amplicostata

Binomial name
- Bellaspira amplicostata Fallon, 2016

Species of gastropod

Bellaspira amplicostata is a species of sea snail, a marine gastropod mollusc in the family Drilliidae.

== Description ==
The size of an adult shell varies between 6 mm and 9 mm.

Bellaspira amplicostata is a predator, and has a benthos functional group.

== Distribution ==
This species occurs in the Caribbean Sea off Quintana Roo, Yucátan Peninsula, Mexico.
