= Bellaspira margaritensis =

Scientific classification
- Kingdom: Animalia
- Phylum: Mollusca
- Class: Gastropoda
- Subclass: Caenogastropoda
- Order: Neogastropoda
- Superfamily: Conoidea
- Family: Drilliidae
- Genus: Bellaspira
- Species: B. margaritensis

Binomial name
- Bellaspira margaritensis McLean & L. Poorman, 1970

Species of gastropod

Bellaspira margaritensis is a species of sea snail, a marine gastropod mollusk in the family Drilliidae.

== Description ==
The size of an adult shell varies between 10 mm and 16 mm.

== Distribution ==
This species occurs in the Caribbean Sea off Colombia and Venezuela.
