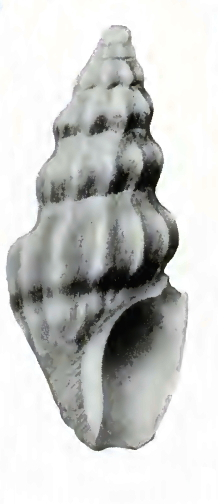
- Original image of a shell of Douglassia enae

Scientific classification
- Kingdom: Animalia
- Phylum: Mollusca
- Class: Gastropoda
- Subclass: Caenogastropoda
- Order: Neogastropoda
- Superfamily: Conoidea
- Family: Drilliidae
- Genus: Douglassia
- Species: D. enae

Binomial name
- Douglassia enae (P. Bartsch, 1934)

Synonyms
- Clavus (Douglassia) enae Wenz, 1943; Drillia enae (Bartsch, 1934)

= Douglassia enae =

Species of gastropod

Douglassia enae is a species of sea snail, a marine gastropod mollusk in the family Drilliidae.

== Description ==
The shell grows to a length of 17 mm, its diameter 6.9 mm.

(Original description) The elongate-conic shell is wax-yellow with a broad pale-brown band at the periphery. The protoconch contains 2.5 smooth whorls 2.5, forming a pointed apex. The beginning of the postnuclear whorls has the axial riblets characteristic of the later postnuclear whorls, but here they are a little more slender and a little more closely approximated. The postnuclear whorls are marked by strong axial ribs that almost form cusps at the anterior termination of the posterior sinal region. They extend only very feebly across the sinal area, which occupies the posterior two-fifths of the whorls. On the body whorl these ribs are decidedly enfeebled on the base and evanesce at the junction with the columella. Of the axial ribs, 10 occur upon the first six whorls, 12 upon the seventh and the last whorl. These ribs are about one third as wide as the spaces that separate them, the latter being broad and concave. In addition to the axial ribs the whorls are marked by rather strong incremental lines that have a decidedly sigmoid curve, being retractively slanting at the posterior sinal region and protractively anterior to this. The spiral sculpture consists of numerous, closely spaced, microscopic obsolete spiral lines. The base of the shell is moderately well rounded. The columella is short and stubby, and is marked by 12 rather strong sinuous spiral threads and finer spiral lines corresponding to those on the spire and base. The aperture is moderately large and rather broad, decidedly channeled posteriorly and anteriorly with a feeble stromboid notch. The outer lip is protracted between the posterior angle and the stromboid notch into a clawlike element, while the inner lip is reflected over the columella as a heavy callus, which extends over the parietal wall and projects into the aperture at the posterior sinus as a decided knob. There is a heavy varix about one sixth of a turn behind the edge of the outer lip.

== Distribution ==
This species occurs in the demersal zone of the Caribbean Sea off Puerto Rico at depths between 73 m and 146 m; off Barbados and Guadeloupe; off Brazil.
