= Lissodrillia arcas =

Scientific classification
- Kingdom: Animalia
- Phylum: Mollusca
- Class: Gastropoda
- Subclass: Caenogastropoda
- Order: Neogastropoda
- Superfamily: Conoidea
- Family: Drilliidae
- Genus: Lissodrillia
- Species: L. arcas

Binomial name
- Lissodrillia arcas Fallon, 2016

Species of gastropod

Lissodrillia arcas is a species of sea snail, a marine gastropod mollusc in the family Drilliidae.

== Description ==
The length of the shell varies between 4.5 mm and 6 mm.

== Distribution ==
This species occurs in the Gulf of Mexico off the Campeche Bank, Yucatán; Mexico.
