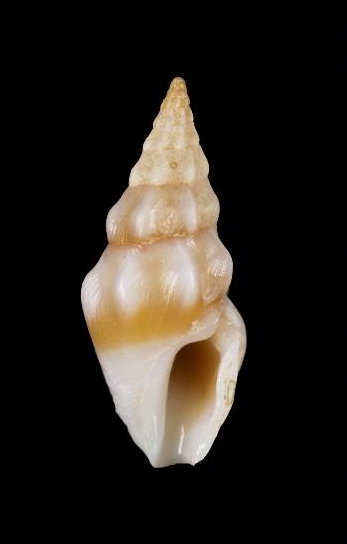
- Shell of Douglassia antillensis (specimen in MNHN, Paris)

Scientific classification
- Kingdom: Animalia
- Phylum: Mollusca
- Class: Gastropoda
- Subclass: Caenogastropoda
- Order: Neogastropoda
- Superfamily: Conoidea
- Family: Drilliidae
- Genus: Douglassia
- Species: D. antillensis

Binomial name
- Douglassia antillensis Fallon, 2016

= Douglassia antillensis =

Species of gastropod

Douglassia antillensis is a species of sea snail, a marine gastropod mollusc in the family Drilliidae.

== Description ==
The size of an adult shell varies between 10 mm and 13 mm.

== Distribution ==
This species occurs in the demersal zone of the Caribbean Sea, the Gulf of Mexico, and the Lesser Antilles.
