= Bellaspira clarionensis =

Scientific classification
- Kingdom: Animalia
- Phylum: Mollusca
- Class: Gastropoda
- Subclass: Caenogastropoda
- Order: Neogastropoda
- Superfamily: Conoidea
- Family: Drilliidae
- Genus: Bellaspira
- Species: B. clarionensis

Binomial name
- Bellaspira clarionensis McLean & L. Poorman, 1970

Species of gastropod

Bellaspira clarionensis is a species of sea snail, a marine gastropod mollusk in the family Drilliidae.

== Description ==
The height of the shell attains 13.5 mm, its diameter 5.9 mm.

== Distribution ==
This species occurs in the Pacific Ocean from Mexico to Panama.
