= Bellaspira minutissima =

Scientific classification
- Kingdom: Animalia
- Phylum: Mollusca
- Class: Gastropoda
- Subclass: Caenogastropoda
- Order: Neogastropoda
- Superfamily: Conoidea
- Family: Drilliidae
- Genus: Bellaspira
- Species: B. minutissima

Binomial name
- Bellaspira minutissima Fallon, 2016

Species of gastropod

Bellaspira minutissima is a species of sea snail, a marine gastropod mollusc in the family Drilliidae.

== Description ==
The length of an adult shell attains 50 mm.

== Distribution ==
This species occurs off the Bahamas.
