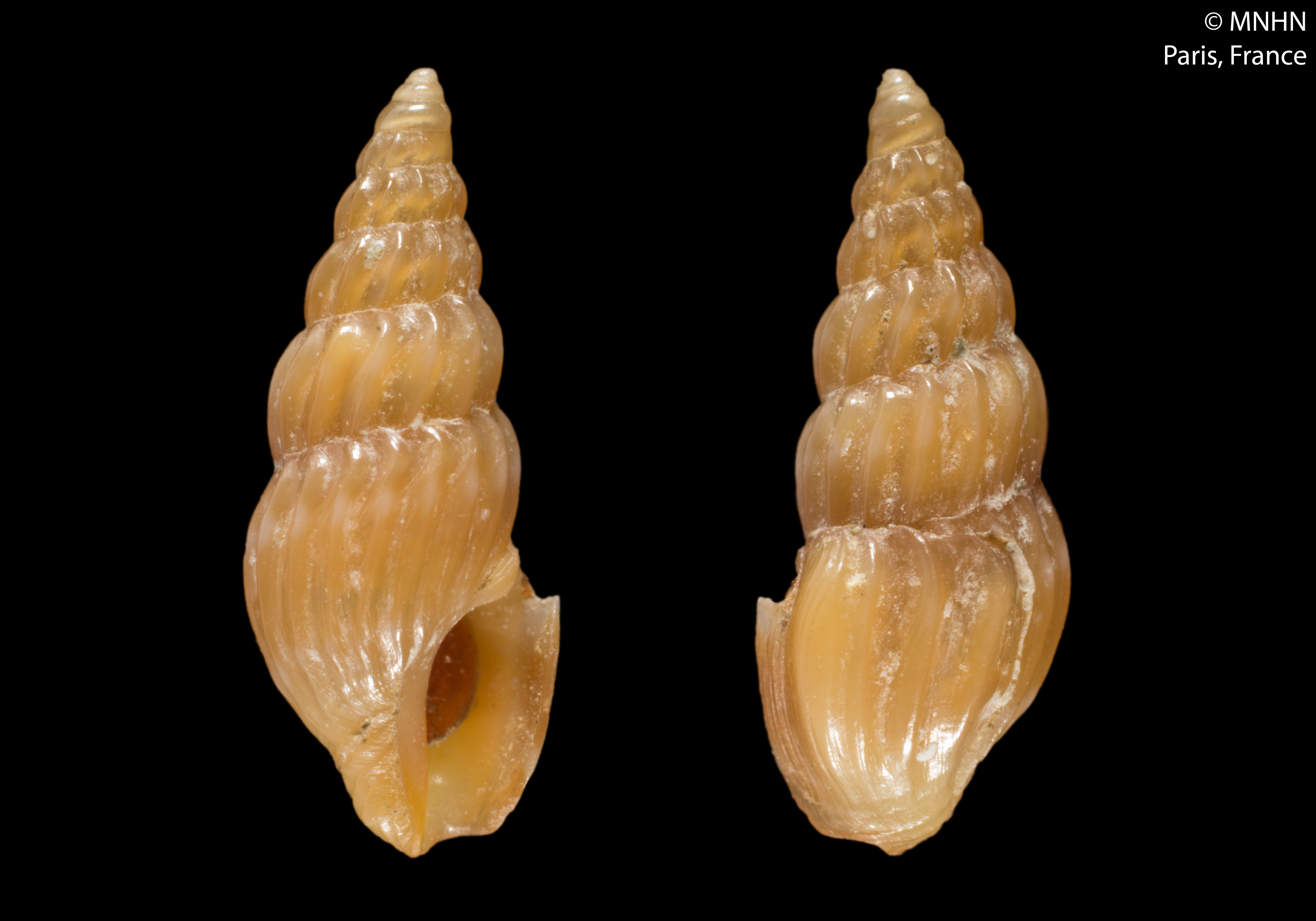
- Shell of Cerodrillia nicklesi (holotype at MNHN, Paris)

Scientific classification
- Kingdom: Animalia
- Phylum: Mollusca
- Class: Gastropoda
- Subclass: Caenogastropoda
- Order: Neogastropoda
- Superfamily: Conoidea
- Family: Drilliidae
- Genus: Cerodrillia
- Species: C. nicklesi

Binomial name
- Cerodrillia nicklesi (Knudsen, 1956)

Synonyms
- Drillia nicklesi Knudsen, 1956

= Cerodrillia nicklesi =

Species of gastropod

Cerodrillia nicklesi is a species of sea snail, a marine gastropod mollusk in the family Drilliidae.

== Description ==
The length of an adult shell varies between 6 mm and 9 mm.

== Distribution ==
This species occurs in the demersal zone of the Atlantic Ocean off Western Sahara and Senegal
