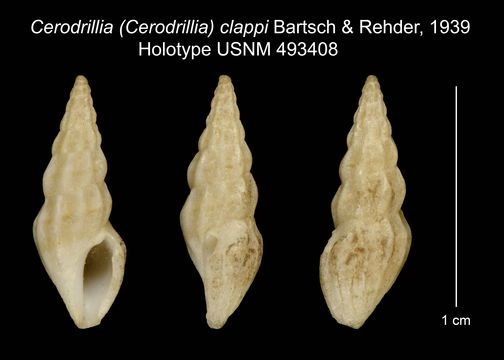

Scientific classification
- Kingdom: Animalia
- Phylum: Mollusca
- Class: Gastropoda
- Subclass: Caenogastropoda
- Order: Neogastropoda
- Superfamily: Conoidea
- Family: Drilliidae
- Genus: Cerodrillia
- Species: C. clappi

Binomial name
- Cerodrillia clappi Bartsch & Rehder, 1939

= Cerodrillia clappi =

Species of gastropod

Cerodrillia clappi is a species of sea snail, a marine gastropod mollusk in the family Drilliidae.

It is the type species of the genus Cerodrillia.

== Description ==
The shell grows to a length of 12 mm.

== Distribution ==
This species occurs in the Gulf of Mexico from the Florida Keys to Texas at depths between 7 m and 73 m.
