= Cerodrillia bahamensis =

Scientific classification
- Kingdom: Animalia
- Phylum: Mollusca
- Class: Gastropoda
- Subclass: Caenogastropoda
- Order: Neogastropoda
- Superfamily: Conoidea
- Family: Drilliidae
- Genus: Cerodrillia
- Species: C. bahamensis

Binomial name
- Cerodrillia bahamensis (Bartsch, 1943)

Synonyms
- Viridrillia bahamensis Bartsch, 1943

Species of gastropod

Cerodrillia bahamensis is a species of sea snail, a marine gastropod mollusk in the family Drilliidae.

== Description ==
The white shell attains a length of 10 mm, its protoconch consisting of 2.1 whorls.

== Distribution ==
This marine species occurs off the Bahamas.
