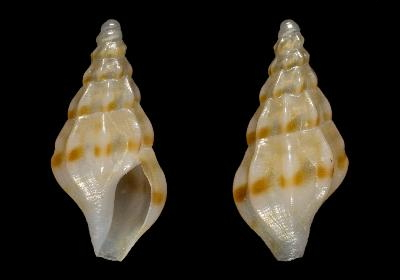
- Shell of Bellaspira tricolor (holotype in the MNHN, Paris)

Scientific classification
- Kingdom: Animalia
- Phylum: Mollusca
- Class: Gastropoda
- Subclass: Caenogastropoda
- Order: Neogastropoda
- Superfamily: Conoidea
- Family: Drilliidae
- Genus: Bellaspira
- Species: B. tricolor

Binomial name
- Bellaspira tricolor Fallon, 2016

= Bellaspira tricolor =

Species of gastropod

Bellaspira tricolor is a species of sea snail, a marine gastropod mollusc in the family Drilliidae.

== Description ==
The size of an adult shell varies between 2.4 mm and 7 mm.

== Distribution ==
This species occurs in the Caribbean Sea off Guadeloupe.
