= Cerodrillia asymmetrica =

Scientific classification
- Kingdom: Animalia
- Phylum: Mollusca
- Class: Gastropoda
- Subclass: Caenogastropoda
- Order: Neogastropoda
- Superfamily: Conoidea
- Family: Drilliidae
- Genus: Cerodrillia
- Species: C. asymmetrica

Binomial name
- Cerodrillia asymmetrica McLean & Poorman, 1971

Species of gastropod

Cerodrillia asymmetrica is a species of sea snail, a marine gastropod mollusk in the family Drilliidae.

== Distribution ==
This species occurs in the Pacific Ocean off the Galapagos Islands.
