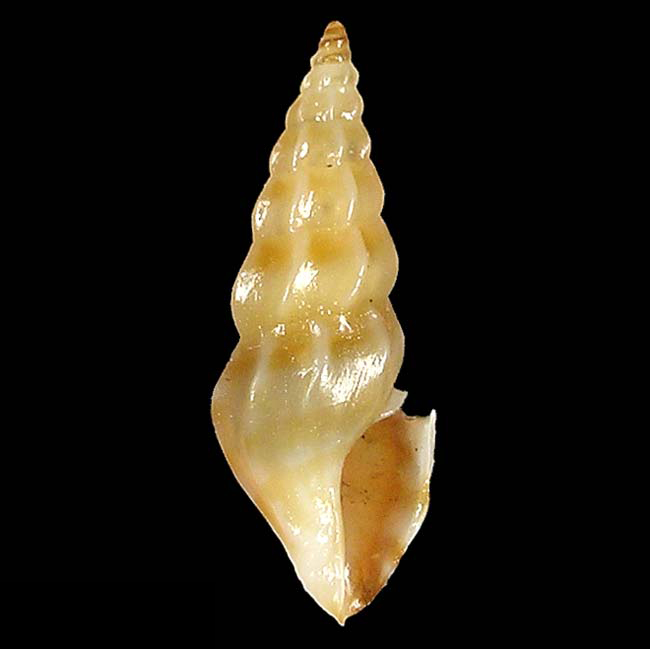

Scientific classification
- Kingdom: Animalia
- Phylum: Mollusca
- Class: Gastropoda
- Subclass: Caenogastropoda
- Order: Neogastropoda
- Family: Drilliidae
- Genus: Cerodrillia
- Species: C. jerrywallsi

Binomial name
- Cerodrillia jerrywallsi Stahlschmidt, Poppe & Tagaro, 2018

= Cerodrillia jerrywallsi =

Species of gastropod

Cerodrillia jerrywallsi is a species of sea snail, a marine gastropoda mollusk in the family Drilliidae.

== Original description ==
- Poppe G.T., Tagaro S.P. & Goto Y. (2018). New marine species from the Central Philippines. Visaya. 5(1): 91-135. page(s): 103, pl. 9 figs 1-2.
