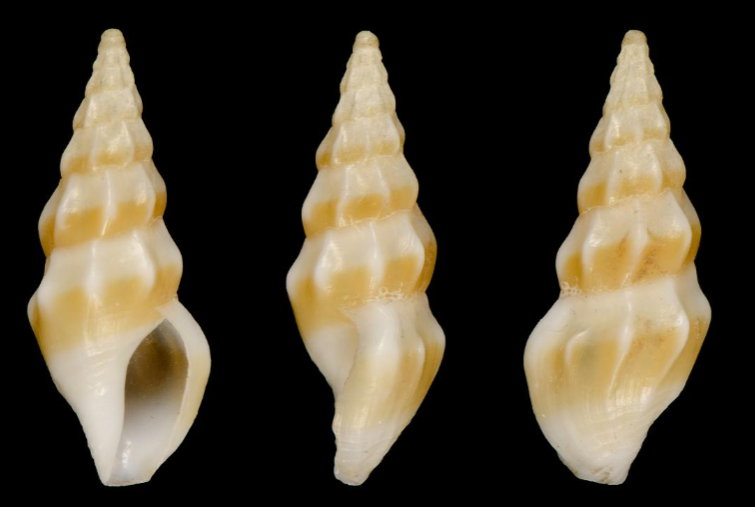
- Shell of Cerodrillia perryae (holotype at the Smithsonian Institution)

Scientific classification
- Kingdom: Animalia
- Phylum: Mollusca
- Class: Gastropoda
- Subclass: Caenogastropoda
- Order: Neogastropoda
- Superfamily: Conoidea
- Family: Drilliidae
- Genus: Cerodrillia
- Species: C. perryae

Binomial name
- Cerodrillia perryae Bartsch & Rehder, 1939

Synonyms
- Cerodrillia (Cerodrillia) perryae Bartsch & Rehder, 1939

= Cerodrillia perryae =

Species of gastropod

Cerodrillia perryae is a species of sea snail, a marine gastropod mollusk in the family Drilliidae.

== Description ==
The size of an adult shell varies between 5 mm and 17 mm.

== Distribution ==
This species occurs in the Gulf of Mexico, the Caribbean Sea and the Atlantic Ocean off Brazil at depths between 2 m and 95 m.
