= Viridrillia aureofasciata =

Scientific classification
- Kingdom: Animalia
- Phylum: Mollusca
- Class: Gastropoda
- Subclass: Caenogastropoda
- Order: Neogastropoda
- Superfamily: Conoidea
- Family: Pseudomelatomidae
- Genus: Viridrillia
- Species: V. aureofasciata

Binomial name
- Viridrillia aureofasciata García, 2008

Species of gastropod

Viridrillia aureofasciata is a species of sea snail, a marine gastropod mollusk in the family Pseudomelatomidae, the turrids and allies.

== Description ==
The length of the shell attains 14.9 mm, its diameter is 5.2 mm.

== Distribution ==
This marine species occurs off Alabama, West Florida, United States and Bahia de Campeche, Mexico.
