= Bellaspira grippi =

Scientific classification
- Kingdom: Animalia
- Phylum: Mollusca
- Class: Gastropoda
- Subclass: Caenogastropoda
- Order: Neogastropoda
- Family: Drilliidae
- Genus: Bellaspira
- Species: B. grippi

Binomial name
- Bellaspira grippi (Dall, 1908)

Synonyms
- Bela grippi Dall, 1908

Species of gastropod

Bellaspira grippi is a species of sea snail, a marine gastropod mollusc in the family Drilliidae.

== Description ==
The size of an adult shell varies between 9 mm and 14 mm.

(Original description) The small shell has a straw-color or is pale brown with occasional spiral bands of darker brown, or all brown. It contains 6 whorls, of which the first whorl and a half are white, polished, smooth and turgid. The subsequent whorls of the shell have a dull surface. The earlier whorls have the periphery nearer the anterior suture, the whorl behind the periphery somewhat flattened and compressed, crossed by low obscure riblets, about a dozen on the fourth whorl, which become obsolete later. The whorl in front of the periphery shows no axial sculpture. The whole whorl is spirally sculptured with narrow sharp incised lines, one dividing the space behind the periphery, and about five in front of the periphery on the penultimate whorl. On the body whorl between the periphery and the siphonal fasciole there are about twelve of these lines, though they probably vary in number with the individual, while the incremental lines are moderately conspicuous. The outer lip is thin and simple. The columellar lips show a small deposit of white callus. The lunate aperture is narrow,. The siphonal canal is very short, wide, with an inconspicuous fasciole.

== Distribution ==
This species occurs in the Atlantic Ocean off Eastern Brazil.
