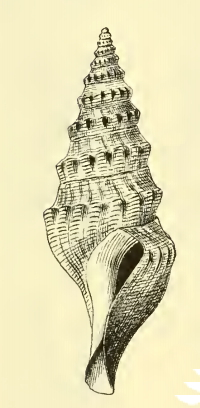
- Original drawing of a shell of Lissodrillia verrillii

Scientific classification
- Kingdom: Animalia
- Phylum: Mollusca
- Class: Gastropoda
- Subclass: Caenogastropoda
- Order: Neogastropoda
- Superfamily: Conoidea
- Family: Drilliidae
- Genus: Lissodrillia
- Species: L. verrillii

Binomial name
- Lissodrillia verrillii (Dall, 1881)

Synonyms
- Cerodrillia verrillii (Dall, 1881); Pleurotoma (Drillia) verrillii Dall, 1881

= Lissodrillia verrillii =

Species of gastropod

Lissodrillia verrillii is a species of sea snail, a marine gastropod mollusk in the family Drilliidae.

It was named by W.H. Dall after the American malacologist Addison Emory Verrill (1839-1926), the first professor of zoology at the Yale University.

== Description ==
The shell grows to a length of 5.5 mm.

The shell resembles Drillia oleacina on a very small scale. It is white, with a large white, smooth, inflated protoconch. It contains six or seven whorls, rounded, polished, translucent waxen whitish. It is transversely sculptured by twelve to fourteen rounded, stout, strongly raised ribs extending forward from the notch-band to the suture, or on the body whorl to its anterior third. On the last half of the last turn it is evanescent. The suture is appressed The lines of growth are evident. There is no spiral sculpture visible. A decided callus with a groove behind it is visible on the columella and the body whorl notch, as usual in the adult, rather deep. The aperture is rather wide behind, and shaped as in Drillia oleacina.

== Distribution ==
The species occurs in the Gulf of Mexico and the Caribbean Sea at depths between 73 m and 567 m.
