= Viridrillia hendersoni =

Scientific classification
- Kingdom: Animalia
- Phylum: Mollusca
- Class: Gastropoda
- Subclass: Caenogastropoda
- Order: Neogastropoda
- Superfamily: Conoidea
- Family: Pseudomelatomidae
- Genus: Viridrillia
- Species: V. hendersoni

Binomial name
- Viridrillia hendersoni Bartsch, 1943

Synonyms
- Viridrillia (Viridrillina) hendersoni P. Bartsch, 1943

Species of gastropod

Viridrillia hendersoni is a species of sea snail, a marine gastropod mollusk in the family Pseudomelatomidae, the turrids and allies.

== Distribution ==
This marine species occurs off Florida and Texas, United States.
