= Cerodrillia girardi =

Scientific classification
- Kingdom: Animalia
- Phylum: Mollusca
- Class: Gastropoda
- Subclass: Caenogastropoda
- Order: Neogastropoda
- Superfamily: Conoidea
- Family: Drilliidae
- Genus: Cerodrillia
- Species: C. girardi

Binomial name
- Cerodrillia girardi Lyons, 1972

Species of gastropod

Cerodrillia girardi is a species of sea snail, a marine gastropod mollusk in the family Drilliidae.

== Description ==
The size of an adult shell varies between 9 mm and 13 mm.

== Distribution ==
This species occurs in the Atlantic Ocean from South Carolina to Florida, and in the Gulf of Mexico at depths between 49 m and 73 m.
