= Drillia oleacina =

Scientific classification
- Kingdom: Animalia
- Phylum: Mollusca
- Class: Gastropoda
- Subclass: Caenogastropoda
- Order: Neogastropoda
- Superfamily: Conoidea
- Family: Drilliidae
- Genus: Drillia
- Species: D. oleacina

Binomial name
- Drillia oleacina (Dall, 1881)

Synonyms
- Pleurotoma (Drillia) oleacina Dall, 1881 (basionym)

Species of gastropod

Drillia oleacina is a species of sea snail, a marine gastropod mollusk in the family Drilliidae.

== Description ==
The shell grows to a length of 10 mm; its diameter 3 mm.

(Original description) The sculpture of the shell much resembles Globidrillia smirna (Dall, 1881), especially on the older whorls which differ from those of G. smirna in the following particulars : the protoconch is a rich, dark, shining brown.he nodules have more extended bases, and want the white tips. The color of the whorls is more clearly translucent, wanting the pinkish tinge and the white sutural line; the whorls increase more rapidly in size, and are strongly appressed against their predecessors, thus making the line of the suture irregular. The shell contains nine whorls. The body whorl is quite different in shape and sculpture. The nodules, of which there are on the body whorl only eleven, instead of becoming obsolete on the latter half of the whorl, are produced in the form of stout, strong ribs over the periphery, when these suddenly cease and the anterior part of the whorl is as it were constricted, instead of gradually tapering to the siphonal canal, so that the latter is much more clearly differentiated from the rest of the aperture than is usual in this genus. There is no spiral sculpture, even on the siphonal canal where traces are usually perceptible. The anal sulcus is moderately deep, the notch-band not strongly marked. A thin callus on the columella rising into a sort of lamina at its outer edge forms a rather deep groove along the columella, which last is attenuated anteriorly.

== Distribution ==
This species occurs in the demersal zone of the Caribbean Sea (Cuba), the Gulf of Mexico and the Lesser Antilles (the Grenadines) at a depth of over 500 m.
