= Bellaspira hannyae =

Scientific classification
- Kingdom: Animalia
- Phylum: Mollusca
- Class: Gastropoda
- Subclass: Caenogastropoda
- Order: Neogastropoda
- Superfamily: Conoidea
- Family: Drilliidae
- Genus: Bellaspira
- Species: B. hannyae

Binomial name
- Bellaspira hannyae (De Jong & Coomans, 1988)

Synonyms
- Cerodrillia hannyae De Jong & Coomans, 1988 (original combination)

Species of gastropod

Bellaspira hannyae is a species of sea snail, a marine gastropod mollusk in the family Drilliidae.

== Description ==
The length of the shell varies between 5 mm and 8 mm.

== Distribution ==
This species occurs in Caribbean Sea off the Netherlands Antilles and Venezuela.
