= Douglassia bealiana =

Scientific classification
- Kingdom: Animalia
- Phylum: Mollusca
- Class: Gastropoda
- Subclass: Caenogastropoda
- Order: Neogastropoda
- Superfamily: Conoidea
- Family: Drilliidae
- Genus: Douglassia
- Species: D. bealiana

Binomial name
- Douglassia bealiana Schwengel & McGinty, 1942

Synonyms
- Cerodrillia bealiana Turgeon et al., 1988; Drillia bealiana (Schwengel & McGinty, 1942)

Species of gastropod

Douglassia bealiana, common name Beal's drillia, is a species of sea snail, a marine gastropod mollusk in the family Drilliidae.

This species was renamed Drillia bealiana by E.C. Rios in 1994.

== Description ==
The size of an adult shell varies between 8 and 12 mm (0.31 and 0.47 in).

== Distribution ==
This species occurs in the demersal zone of the Atlantic Ocean from Florida to North Brazil at depths between 26 and 91 m (85 and 299 ft).
