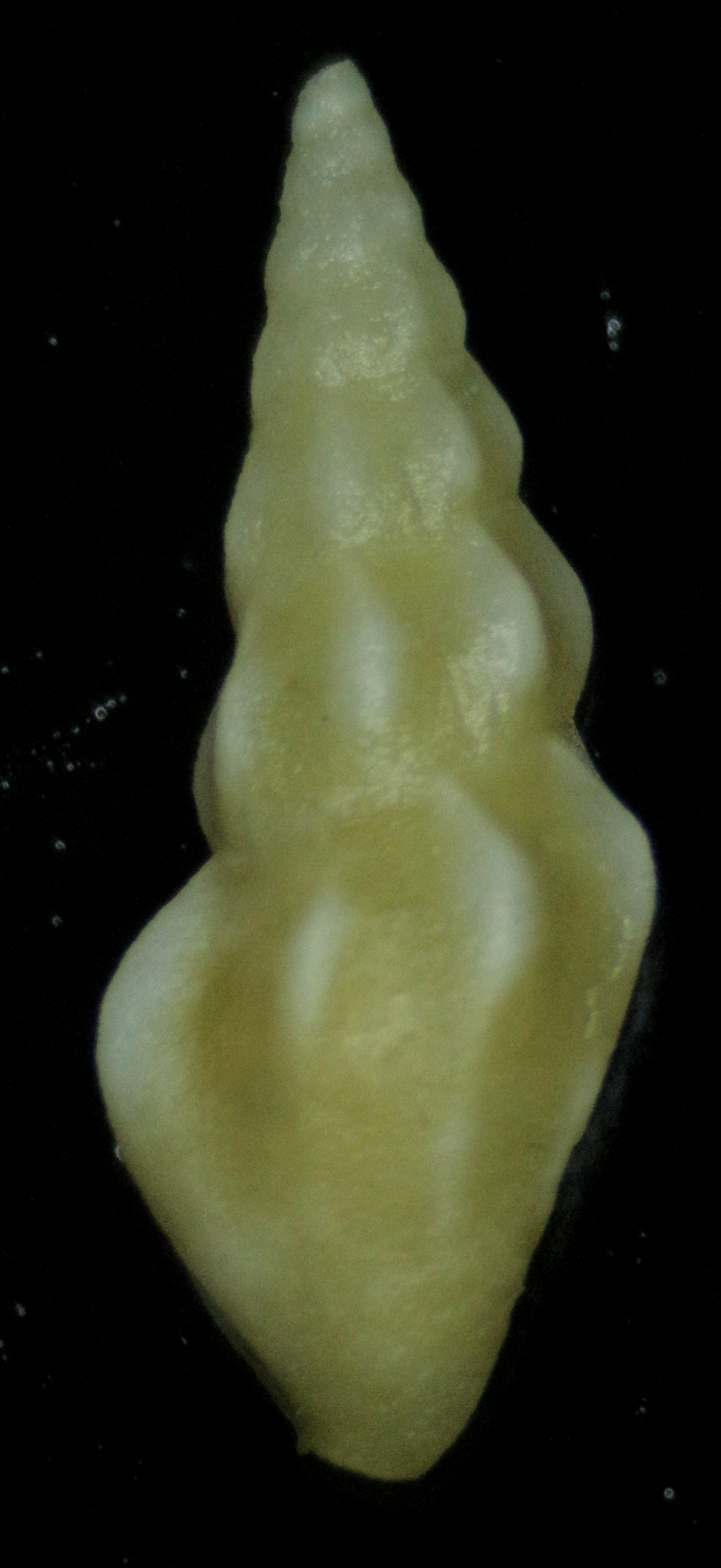
- Shell of Cerodrillia thea

Scientific classification
- Kingdom: Animalia
- Phylum: Mollusca
- Class: Gastropoda
- Subclass: Caenogastropoda
- Order: Neogastropoda
- Superfamily: Conoidea
- Family: Drilliidae
- Genus: Cerodrillia
- Species: C. thea

Binomial name
- Cerodrillia thea (Dall, 1884)

Synonyms
- Cymatosyrinx thea (Dall, 1884); Drillia thea Dall, 1884

= Cerodrillia thea =

Species of gastropod

Cerodrillia thea is a species of sea snail, a marine gastropod mollusk in the family Drilliidae.

== Description ==
The elongate shell size varies between 13 mm and 19 mm. The shell is ashy olivaceous, covered with a shiny very thin epidermis, and is claret-brown within the aperture. The whitish apex is small and rather blunt. There are eight, moderately convex, smooth whorls with eleven short, somewhat oblique, slightly curved, strong axial ribs, more prominent on the periphery and fading away towards the sutures and not distinctly differentiated from the interspaces. They are somewhat irregularly waved and concave anteriorly. The shell shows an evanescent spiral strife, not always visible, and eight or ten spiral raised threads on the anterior third of the body whorl. The body whorl is otherwise smooth. The notch is deep, rounded and leaving no fasciole. The short siphonal canal is straight. The sutures are distinct and slightly appressed. The wide, oval aperture is short and is internally claret brown. The inner lip shows a slight callus. The outer lip is much curved forward, polished and smooth within.

== Distribution ==
This species occurs in the Gulf of Mexico, the Caribbean Sea and the Lesser Antilles; in the Atlantic Ocean off Eastern Brazil at depths up to 203 m.
