= Crassispira fuscocincta =

Scientific classification
- Kingdom: Animalia
- Phylum: Mollusca
- Class: Gastropoda
- Subclass: Caenogastropoda
- Order: Neogastropoda
- Superfamily: Conoidea
- Family: Pseudomelatomidae
- Genus: Crassispira
- Species: C. fuscocincta

Binomial name
- Crassispira fuscocincta (C. B. Adams, 1850)

Synonyms
- Cerodrillia fuscocincta (C. B. Adams, 1850); Pleurotoma fuscocincta C. B. Adams, 1850

Species of gastropod

Crassispira fuscocincta is a species of sea snail, a marine gastropod mollusk in the family Pseudomelatomidae.

== Description ==
The length of the shell attains 10.5 mm, its diameter 4.5 mm.

(Original description) The shell has an elevate pyramidal shape. The shell contains 7-8 whorls, not convex and with the suture not impressed. The color of the shell pale is yellowish white with a sutural line of brown, anteriorly wax yellow with revolving lines of yellowish white, with a spiral series of large smooth well-rounded nodules on slightly elevated wide ridges on the lower half of the whorls; anteriorly with a few spiral raised lines. The apex is acute. The spire shows a rectilineal outline. The aperture is rather wide. The siphonal canal is very short.

== Distribution ==
This marine species occurs in the Caribbean Sea off Jamaica and the ABC Islands
