= Splendrillia bahamasensis =

Scientific classification
- Kingdom: Animalia
- Phylum: Mollusca
- Class: Gastropoda
- Subclass: Caenogastropoda
- Order: Neogastropoda
- Superfamily: Conoidea
- Family: Drilliidae
- Genus: Splendrillia
- Species: S. bahamasensis

Binomial name
- Splendrillia bahamasensis Fallon, 2016

Species of gastropod

Splendrillia bahamasensis is a species of sea snail, a marine gastropod mollusk in the family Drilliidae.

== Description ==
The length of the shell varies between 7 mm and 21 mm. The shell is fusiform, truncated anteriorly and glossy. The whorls are appressed with the shoulders sloping and the convex is below. The body whorl is larger than the spire: body whorl is 62% the snail's total length. The protoconch is shaped like a paucispiral of approximately 2 smooth whorls with the first whorl partially submerged and the second is larger than the first. The axial sculpture consists of broad low ribs with the crests of most of the ribs rounded anteriorly becoming narrower near the sulcus and terminating at the sulcus with evanscence on the shell base. The ribs are slightly oblique on early whorls but progressively less near the body whorl: the ribs are missing between the varix and the edge of the outer lip and about as wide as their interspaces. There are 8 ribs on the penultimate in the holotype (the average amount of ribs on the penultimate is 6-10), 6 to varix on the body whorl (only 4-8 specimens have a varix). Heavy compact growth striae are present on the shell surface. The spiral sculpture of microscopic lines are often obscured by the growth striae around the shell with weak spiral ridges on the anterior fasciole. The sulcus is broad but slightly concave about ¼ the spire whorl height with trace swellings of reduced ribs. The varix is broader and higher than preceding ribs that are positioned about ⅓-turn from the edge of the outer lip. The outer lip is smooth and thick, juts out somewhat and flexed inwards at its edge. A slight indentation present anteriorly may suggest a stromboid notch. The anal sinus is moderately deep in mature specimens and adjoins the suture near the back of the sinus behind the parietal callus. The inner lip is thin but not margined but in older shells, the inner lip is margined. The inner lip is erect anteriorly near the tip of the canal but thin on the parietal wall that ends in a low sutue line. The anterior canal is short but distinct: open and notched. The columella is slightly twisted to the left and anteriorly viewed ventrally, the anterior fasciole slightly swollen. The color is white with light pink to rose colored bands mid whorl and anteriorly. There are dark colored streaks between the ribs and on the apertural side of the varix. Other forms are patterned similarly with brownish-orange or a combination with brownish-orange and rose.

== Distribution ==
This marine species occurs off the Bahamas.
