= Viridrillia cervina =

Scientific classification
- Kingdom: Animalia
- Phylum: Mollusca
- Class: Gastropoda
- Subclass: Caenogastropoda
- Order: Neogastropoda
- Superfamily: Conoidea
- Family: Pseudomelatomidae
- Genus: Viridrillia
- Species: V. cervina

Binomial name
- Viridrillia cervina Bartsch, 1943

Synonyms
- Cerodrillia cervina (Bartsch, 1943); Clavus ebur auct. non Reeve, 1845; Drillia ebur auct. non Reeve, 1845

Species of gastropod

Viridrillia cervina is a species of sea snail, a marine gastropod mollusk in the family Pseudomelatomidae, the turrids and allies.

== Description ==
The length of the shell attains 8 mm.

== Distribution ==
This marine species occurs off Cape Hatteras, North Carolina and off Florida, United States.
