= Lissodrillia simpsoni =

Scientific classification
- Kingdom: Animalia
- Phylum: Mollusca
- Class: Gastropoda
- Subclass: Caenogastropoda
- Order: Neogastropoda
- Superfamily: Conoidea
- Family: Drilliidae
- Genus: Lissodrillia
- Species: L. simpsoni

Binomial name
- Lissodrillia simpsoni (Dall, 1887)

Synonyms
- Cerodrillia (Lissodrillia) simpsoni (Simpson, 1886); Cerodrillia recticostata Fargo, W.G., 1953; Drillia cingulata Gardner, J.A., 1948; Pleurotoma (Mangilia) simpsoni Simpson, 1886 (basionym); Syntomodrillia simpsoni (Simpson, 1886)

Species of gastropod

Lissodrillia simpsoni, common name Simpson's drillia, is a species of sea snail, a marine gastropod mollusk in the family Drilliidae.

== Description ==
The length of the shell varies between 4.5 mm and 8 mm; its diameter 2.1 mm.

(Original description) The polished, shining shell contains (including the protoconch) 6½ whorls. The protoconch is madder-brown, smooth, rather large, blunt, with 1½ whorls. The remainder is transversely ribbed with 8–10 smooth, rounded, nearly straight, stout ribs, extending from suture to suture, which begin with the end of the protoconch part, and fail at the last third of the body whorl, which is marked only by a silky fine incremental stride. The spaces between the ribs are equal to or somewhat less than the ribs in width. There is no axial sculpture, or only occasional extremely faint microscopic lines. The whorls are not inflated. The color of the shell is rosy pellucid white, banded in front of the suture with rosy brown, fainter on the ribs, and, in the specimen described, extending forward nearly to the periphery of the earlier whorls. The base of the body whorl is similarly tinged. The last somewhat varicose rib and the outer thickened lip are whitish. The aperture and the siphonal canal are very short and wide, and the notch is deep and large, rounded, leaving no fasciole. The outer lip is lightly thickened, arched forward. There is a slight callus on the columella. The interior is not lirate in the specimen described.

== Distribution ==
This species occurs in the Gulf of Mexico, the Caribbean Sea and the Lesser Antilles; in the Atlantic Ocean off Northern Brazil at depths between 9 m and 82 m.

This species has been found as a fossil in Quaternary strata of the United States (Florida, North Carolina) and also in Pliocene strata in North Carolina; age range: 2.588 to 0.781 Ma.
