= Calliostoma schroederi =

Scientific classification
- Kingdom: Animalia
- Phylum: Mollusca
- Class: Gastropoda
- Subclass: Vetigastropoda
- Order: Trochida
- Family: Calliostomatidae
- Genus: Calliostoma
- Species: C. schroederi

Binomial name
- Calliostoma schroederi Clench & Aguayo, 1938

Synonyms
- Calliostoma (Calliostoma) schroederi Clench & Aguayo, 1938

Species of gastropod

Calliostoma schroederi, common name Schroeder's top shell, is a species of sea snail, a marine gastropod mollusk in the family Calliostomatidae.

== Description ==
The height of the shell attains 31.5 mm. The shell is white and spirals upward into a cone shape.

== Distribution ==
This species occurs in the Caribbean Sea and in the Gulf of Mexico at depths between 265 m and 439 m.
