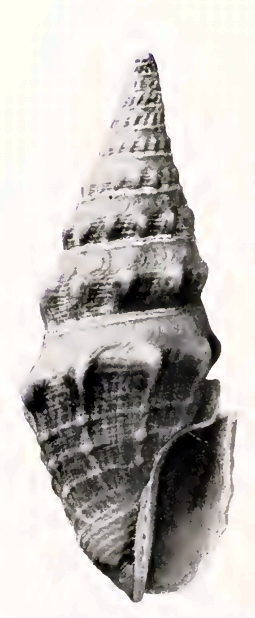
- Original image of a shell of Crassispira abdera

Scientific classification
- Kingdom: Animalia
- Phylum: Mollusca
- Class: Gastropoda
- Subclass: Caenogastropoda
- Order: Neogastropoda
- Superfamily: Conoidea
- Family: Pseudomelatomidae
- Genus: Crassispira
- Species: C. abdera

Binomial name
- Crassispira abdera (Dall, 1919)

Synonyms
- Cerodrillia abdera (Dall, 1919); Clavus abdera (Dall, 1919); Crassispira (Dallspira) abdera (Dall, 1919); Dallspira abdera (Dall, 1919); Dallspira lowei "Watson, R.B." Bartsch, P., 1950; Elaeocyma abdera Dall, 1919 (original combination)

= Crassispira abdera =

Species of gastropod

Crassispira abdera is a species of sea snail, a marine gastropod mollusk in the family Pseudomelatomidae.

== Description ==
The shell of Crassispira abdera can reach up to 15mm in lengthand the 6mm in diameter.

The small shell is acute and thin. It has a dull waxen color with a darker blotch behind the aperture and a dark brown protoconch consisting of a 1 1/2 smooth and polished whorls. The nine subsequent whorls show a spiral sculpture of obscure fine threads. On the body whorl, in addition, there is a more prominent duplex thread in front of the suture on the base, where there are four other widely separated threads that are only prominent as nodules at their intersection with the line of the ribs. There are six or more finer threads on the siphonal canal. The axial sculpture consists of (on the body whorl 7 or 8) ribs which appear at the periphery as conspicuous nodules and become obsolete on the base, except at the intersections mentioned previously. There are also fine, sharp, and close arcuate incremental lines on the anal fasciole. The peripheral nodules are more riblike and numerous on the earlier part of the spire. The aperture is short and rather wide. The anal sulcus is deep, oval, and almost tubular. The outer lip is moderately thickened, sharp-edged, and smooth inside, with a prominent knob behind it. The inner lip smooth with a rather thick layer of enamel continues down the columella with a raised edge and a chink behind it. The siphonal canal is short and wide and hardly differentiated, with an inconspicuous siphonal fasciole.

== Distribution ==
This marine species occurs in the Pacific Ocean off Panama Bay to Ecuador
