= Viridrillia williami =

Scientific classification
- Kingdom: Animalia
- Phylum: Mollusca
- Class: Gastropoda
- Subclass: Caenogastropoda
- Order: Neogastropoda
- Superfamily: Conoidea
- Family: Pseudomelatomidae
- Genus: Viridrillia
- Species: V. williami

Binomial name
- Viridrillia williami Bartsch, 1943

Synonyms
- Cerodrillia williami (Bartsch, 1943); Viridrillia (Viridrillia) williami P. Bartsch, 1943

Species of gastropod

Viridrillia williami is a species of sea snail, a marine gastropod mollusk in the family Pseudomelatomidae, the turrids and allies.

== Description ==
The length of the shell attains 10 mm.

== Distribution ==
This marine species occurs off Florida, United States and in the Caribbean Sea at depths between 27 m and 174 m.
