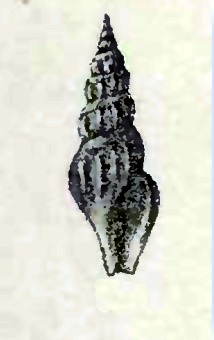
- Drawing of a shell of Splendrillia coccinata

Scientific classification
- Kingdom: Animalia
- Phylum: Mollusca
- Class: Gastropoda
- Subclass: Caenogastropoda
- Order: Neogastropoda
- Superfamily: Conoidea
- Family: Drilliidae
- Genus: Splendrillia
- Species: S. coccinata

Binomial name
- Splendrillia coccinata (Reeve, 1845)

Synonyms
- Cerodrillia augustae C.B. Adams, 1850; Cerodrillia coccinata (Reeve, 1845); Cerodrillia laevisculpta H. von Maltzan, 1883; Douglassia nodosa Nowell-Usticke, 1969; Drillia coccinata (Reeve, 1845); Drillia innocens Melvill, 1923; Drillia interpunctata Smith E.A., 1882; Drillia Iaevisulcata H. von Maltzan, 1883; Pleurotoma coccinata Reeve, 1845; Pleurotoma interpunctata E. A. Smith, 1882; Splendrillia innocens J.C. Melvill, 1923; Splendrillia nodosa G.W. Nowell-Usticke, 1969

= Splendrillia coccinata =

Species of gastropod

Splendrillia coccinata is a species of sea snail, a marine gastropod mollusk in the family Drilliidae.

== Description ==
The shell grows to a length of 16 mm.

The whorls are smooth or obsoletely striate, concave around the upper part, plicately nodose on the periphery. The color of the shell is; pink-white, stained with rose-color between the nodules, and sometimes below them, occasionally faintly banded with rose on the lower part of the body whorl.

== Distribution ==
This species occurs in the Caribbean Sea off Colombia, the Lesser Antilles and off Puerto Rico.
