= Lissodrillia schroederi =

Scientific classification
- Kingdom: Animalia
- Phylum: Mollusca
- Class: Gastropoda
- Subclass: Caenogastropoda
- Order: Neogastropoda
- Superfamily: Conoidea
- Family: Drilliidae
- Genus: Lissodrillia
- Species: L. schroederi

Binomial name
- Lissodrillia schroederi (Bartsch & Rehder, 1939)

Synonyms
- Cerodrillia (Lissodrillia) schroederi Bartsch & Rehder, 1939; Cerodrillia schroederi Bartsch & Rehder, 1939 (original combination)

Species of gastropod

Lissodrillia schroederi is a species of sea snail, a marine gastropod mollusk in the family Drilliidae.

This species is the type species of the genus Lissodrillia Bartsch & Rehder, 1943 as stated by Turgeon et al., 1998

== Description ==
The shell grows to a length of 7.8 mm.

== Distribution ==
This species occurs in the Gulf of Mexico off Western Florida at depths between 9 m and 110 m.
