= Splendrillia panamensis =

Scientific classification
- Kingdom: Animalia
- Phylum: Mollusca
- Class: Gastropoda
- Subclass: Caenogastropoda
- Order: Neogastropoda
- Superfamily: Conoidea
- Family: Drilliidae
- Genus: Splendrillia
- Species: S. panamensis

Binomial name
- Splendrillia panamensis Fallon, 2016

Species of gastropod

Splendrillia panamensis is a species of sea snail, a marine gastropod mollusk in the family Drilliidae.

== Description ==
The length of the shell between 7 mm and 15 mm.

== Distribution ==
This marine species occurs in the Caribbean Sea off the San Blas Islands, Panama.
