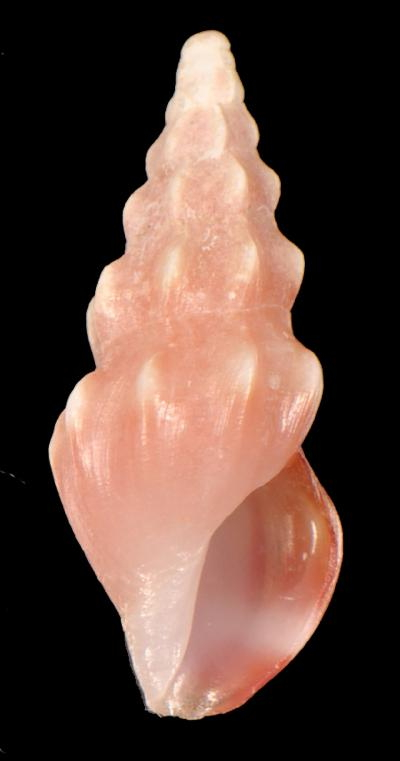
- Shell of Splendrillia interpunctata (specimen at MNHN, Paris)

Scientific classification
- Kingdom: Animalia
- Phylum: Mollusca
- Class: Gastropoda
- Subclass: Caenogastropoda
- Order: Neogastropoda
- Superfamily: Conoidea
- Family: Drilliidae
- Genus: Splendrillia
- Species: S. interpunctata

Binomial name
- Splendrillia interpunctata (E. A. Smith, 1882)

Synonyms
- Douglassia nodosa Nowell-Usticke, 1969; Drillia innocens Melvill, 1923; Pleurotoma (Clavus) interpunctata E. A. Smith, 1882 (basionym); Pleurotoma interpunctata E. A. Smith, 1882 (original combination)

= Splendrillia interpunctata =

Species of gastropod

Splendrillia interpunctata is a species of sea snail, a marine gastropod mollusk in the family Drilliidae.

== Description ==
The length of the shell varies between 7 mm and 16.5 mm.

== Distribution ==
This species occurs in the Caribbean Sea.
