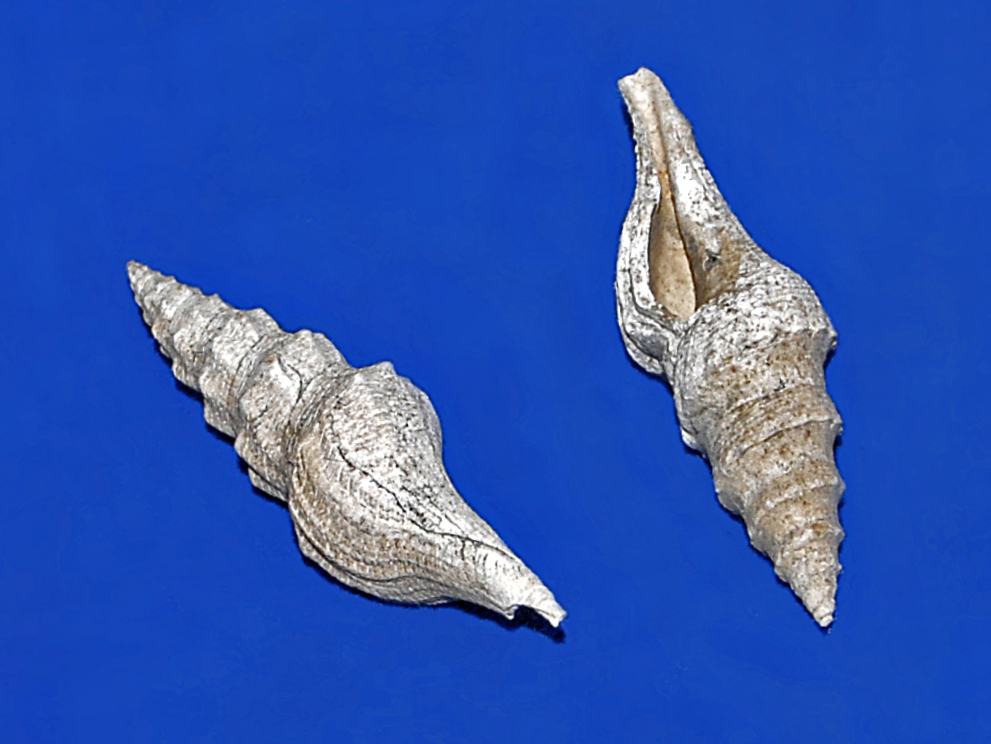
- Fossil shells of Turricula dimidiata

Scientific classification
- Kingdom: Animalia
- Phylum: Mollusca
- Class: Gastropoda
- Subclass: Caenogastropoda
- Order: Neogastropoda
- Superfamily: Conoidea
- Family: Clavatulidae
- Genus: Turricula; Schumacher, 1817

Type species
- Turricula flammea Schumacher, 1817

Synonyms
- Pleurotoma (Surcula); Surcula H. Adams & A. Adams, 1853; Turris (Surcula) H. Adams & A. Adams, 1853

= Turricula (gastropod) =

Turricula Temporal range: Cretaceous – Recent

Genus of gastropods

Turricula is a genus of sea snails, marine gastropod mollusks in the family Clavatulidae.

== Taxonomy ==
Clavatulidae was raised, based on cladistic analysis, from subfamily to the family level by Rosenberg in 1998. It remained regarded as a subfamily of Turridae by several malacologists (Kantor, Sysoev). until a new publication in 2011

== Fossil records ==
This genus is known in the fossil records from the Cretaceous to the Quaternary (age range: from 70.6 to 0.0 million years ago). Fossils of species within this genus have been found all over the world.

== Description ==
The turriculated shell is fusiform with a long spire. The anal sinus is situated in the infrasutural depression above the peripheral carina. The siphonal canal is long, tapering and slightly bent. The operculum has a medio-lateral nucleus. The eyes of the animal are situated at the base of the tentacles. Radula formula : 1-0-1.

== Distribution ==
The species of this marine genus occurs in the Indo-West Pacific, from the Red Sea and east Africa to Australia (Northern Territory, Queensland, Western Australia).

== Species ==
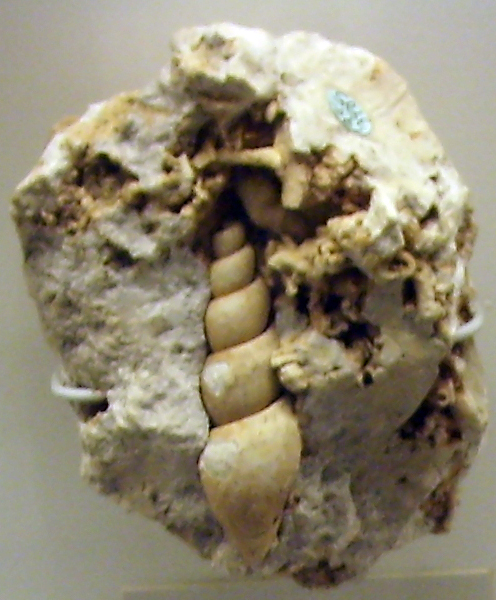
Fossil of the extinct species Surcula faxensis at the Geological Museum in Copenhagen

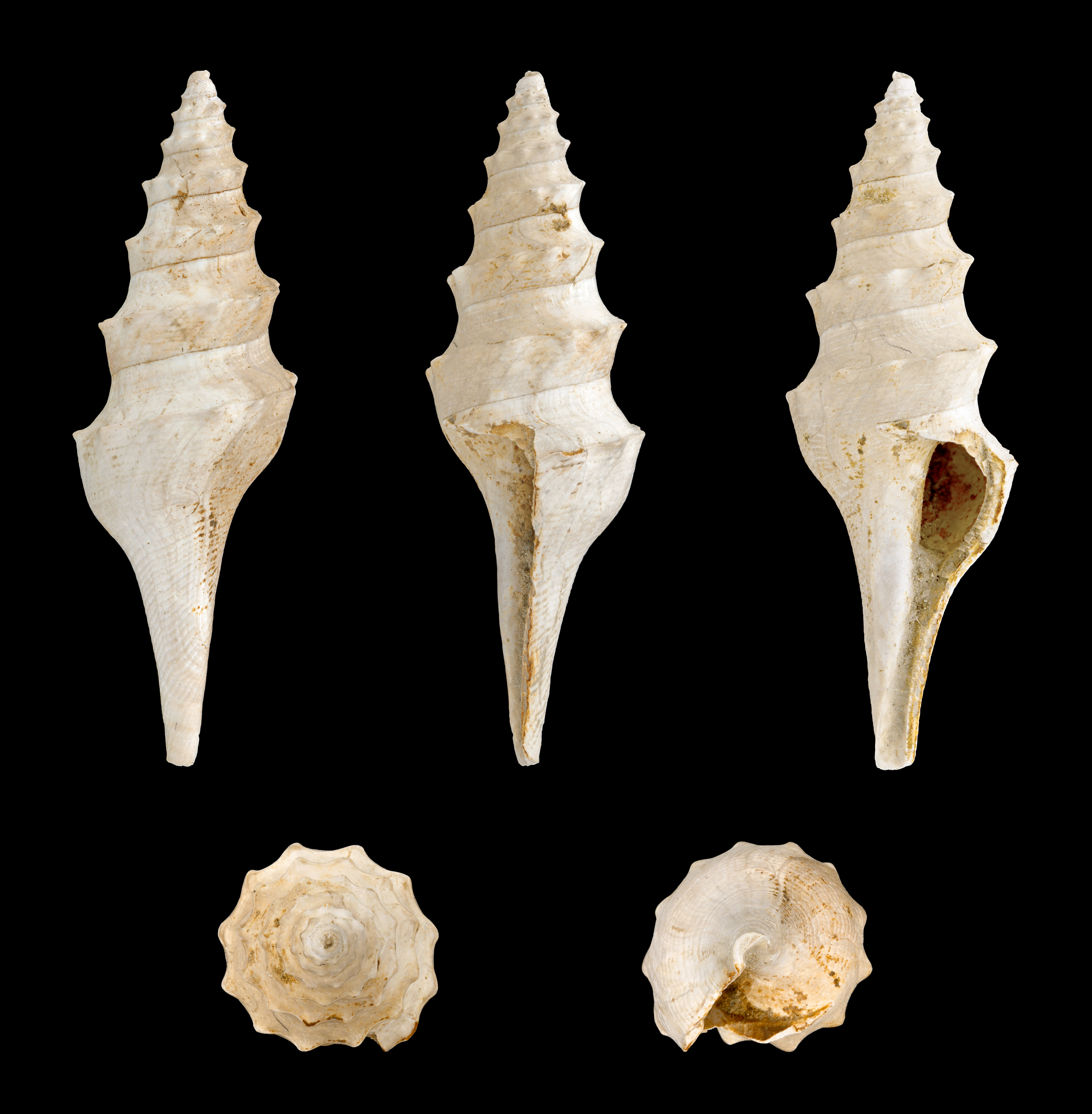
Five views of the shell of Turricula dimidiata (Brocchi, 1814) from the Pliocene of Italy

Species within the genus Turricula include:

- Turricula aethiopica (Thiele, 1925)
- Turricula amplisulcus (Barnard, 1958)
- † Turricula bantamensis (K. Martin, 1895)
- † Turricula barreti (de Boury, 1899)
- † Turricula beamensis M.A. Peyrot, 1925
- † Turricula belgica (G.G. Münster, 1826)
- † Turricula beyrichi (R.A. Philippi, 1846)
- † Turricula brevicauda (Deshayes, 1834)
- Turricula catena (Reeve, 1843)
- † Turricula catenata (Lamarck, 1804)
- † Turricula ceylonica (Smith E. A., 1877)
- Turricula crassicosta (F. E. Edwards, 1857) †
- † Turricula dentata (Lamarck, 1804)
- † Turricula drilliaeformis (K. Martin, 1895)
- † Turricula eastoni (K. Martin, 1914)
- † Turricula everwyni (K. Martin, 1884)
- Turricula faurei (Barnard, 1958)
- † Turricula gembacana (K. Martin, 1884)
- Turricula gemmulaeformis (Thiele, 1925)
- † Turricula glyphana (Bayan, 1873)
- Turricula granobalteus (Hedley, 1922)
- † Turricula guttata (K. Martin, 1935)
- † Turricula hillegondae (K. Martin, 1914)
- † Turricula ijzermani (K. Martin, 1933)
- † Turricula inermiformis (Csepreghy-Meznerics, 1969)
- Turricula javana (Linnaeus, 1767)
- † Turricula jogjacartensis (K. Martin, 1931)
- † Turricula kelirensis (K. Martin, 1916)
- † Turricula lepidota (K. Martin, 1914)
- † Turricula lirocostata Cossmann, 1899
- † Turricula mauritii (de Boury, 1899)
- † Turricula michelini (Deshayes, 1865)
- Turricula navarchus (Melvill & Standen, 1903)
- Turricula nelliae (Smith E. A., 1877)
- † Turricula orthocolpa Cossmann, 1913
- Turricula panthea Dall, 1919
- † Turricula plagiaria (K. Martin, 1931)
- † Turricula plateaui (Cossmann, 1889)
- † Turricula pollii (Icke & K. Martin, 1907)
- † Turricula polycesta (Bayan, 1873)
- Turricula profundorum (Smith E. A., 1896)
- † Turricula rembangensis (K. Martin, 1906)
- † Turricula rostrata Solander in Brander, 1766 (deleted in GBIF)
- † Turricula samarangana (K. Martin, 1884)
- † Turricula sanctistephani Lozouet, 2017
- † Turricula smithi (K. Martin, 1884)
- † Turricula sobrinaeformis Nomura, 1937 (uncertain > unassessed)
- † Turricula streptopleura (Cossmann, 1900)
- † Turricula subelegans (d'Orbigny, 1850)
- Turricula sulcicancellata (Barnard, 1958)
- † Turricula sultani (K. Martin, 1914)
- Turricula sumatrana (Thiele, 1925)
- † Turricula terae Oostingh, 1938 †
- † Turricula textiliosa (Deshayes, 1834)
- Turricula thurstoni (Smith E. A., 1896)
- Turricula tornata (Dillwyn, 1817)
- † Turricula transversaria (Lamarck, 1804)
- Turricula turriplana (Sowerby III, 1903)
- † Turricula vaudini (Deshayes, 1865) †
- † Turricula veslensis (Cossmann, 1899) †
- † Turricula vibekeae Schnetler & M. S. Nielsen, 2018
- † Turricula wanneri (Tesch, 1915)
- † Turricula waringinensis (K. Martin, 1895)

Extinct

- † Turricula dimidiata Brocchi, 1814
- † Turricula eolavinia Olsson, 1930
- † Turricula excelsa Bohm, 1926
- † Turricula hanguensis Cox, 1930
- † Turricula haydeni Cox, 1930
- † Turricula kayalensis Dey, 1961
- † Turricula promensis silistrensis Vredenburg, 1921
- † Turricula promensis Vredenburg, 1921
- † Turricula sethuramae Vredenburg, 1921
- † Turricula spuria Hedley, 1922
- † Turricula taurina Olsson, 1922
- † Turricula terryi Olsson, 1922
- † Turricula thangaensis Vredenburg, 1921

== Synonyms ==
- Turricula bijubata (Reeve, 1843): synonym of Turridrupa bijubata (Reeve, 1843)
- † Turricula (Crenaturricula) bouryi Glibert, 1960: synonym of † Turricula barreti (de Boury, 1899) (unnecessary replacement name for Pleurotoma barreti de Boury, 1899)
- Turricula brunonia Dall, 1924: synonym of Veprecula brunonia (Dall, 1924)
- Turricula cadaverosa (Reeve, 1844): synonym of Vexillum cadaverosum (Reeve, 1844)
- Turricula casta H. Adams, 1872: synonym of Vexillum castum (H. Adams, 1872)
- † Turricula cruziana Olsson, 1932 accepted as † Cruziturricula cruziana (Olsson, 1932) (original combination)
- † Turricula curtata Marwick, 1926 accepted as † Marshallena curtata (Marwick, 1926)
- Turricula ensyuensis Shikama, 1977: synonym of Comitas ensyuensis (Shikama, 1977)
- † Turricula esdailei Marwick, 1926 accepted as † Tahuia esdailei (Marwick, 1926)
- † Turricula (Fusimitra) extranea (Deshayes, 1865): synonym of † Vexillum extraneum (Deshayes, 1865)
- Turricula flammea Schumacher, 1817: synonym of Turricula javana (Linnaeus, 1767)
- † Turricula gendinganensis K. Martin, 1906 accepted as Unedogemmula indica (Röding, 1798)
- Turricula granobalteatus [sic]: synonym of Turricula granobalteus (Hedley, 1922)
- Turricula hondoana Dall, 1925: synonym of Aforia circinata (Dall, 1873)
- † Turricula ilonae Báldi, 1966 accepted as † Domenginella ilonae (Báldi, 1966)
- Turricula japonica Dall, 1925 accepted as Aforia circinata (Dall, 1873)
- Turricula kamakurana (Pilsbry, 1895): synonym of Comitas kamakurana (Pilsbry, 1895)
- Turricula kuroharai Oyama, 1962: synonym of Comitas kuroharai (Oyama, 1962)
- † Turricula lamarckii (Michelotti, 1847) accepted as † Kantoria lamarckii (Michelotti, 1847) (superseded combination)
- Turricula lavinia Dall, 1919: synonym of Ptychobela lavinia (Dall, 1919)
- Turricula lavinoides Olsson, 1922: synonym of Fusiturricula lavinoides (Olsson, 1922)
- Turricula libya Dall, 1919: synonym of Tiariturris libya (Dall, 1919)
- Turricula limonensis Olsson, 1922: synonym of Fusiturricula lavinoides (Olsson, 1922)
- † Turricula mertoni (K. Martin, 1914) accepted as † Pleurofusia mertoni (K. Martin, 1914)
- Turricula modesta Pease, 1868: synonym of Vexillum gruneri (Reeve, 1844) ·
- † Turricula mordax (K. Martin, 1914) accepted as † Pleurofusia mordax (K. Martin, 1914)
- Turricula murrawolga Garrard, 1961: synonym of Comitas murrawolga (Garrard, 1961)
- † Turricula (Costellaria) paucicostata (Tate, 1889): synonym of † Austromitra lacertosa (Cernohorsky, 1970)
- † Turricula permodesta (K. Martin, 1914) accepted as † Pentagoniturricula permodesta (K. Martin, 1914)
- † Turricula planata F. W. Hutton, 1885 accepted as Austromitra planata (F. W. Hutton, 1885)
- Turricula rectilateralis (G.B. Sowerby II, 1874): synonym of Vexillum suluense (A. Adams & Reeve, 1850)
- Turricula scalaria (Barnard, 1958): synonym of Makiyamaia scalaria (Barnard, 1958)
- † Turricula (Costellaria) tatei Cossmann, 1899: synonym of † Austromitra ralphi (Cossmann, 1900)
- † Turricula taurina Olsson, 1922accepted as † Fusiturricula taurina (Olsson, 1922)
- Turricula tornatus [sic]: synonym of Turricula tornata (Dillwyn, 1817)
- Turricula tuberculata (Gray, 1839): synonym of Turricula nelliae spuria (Hedley, 1922)
- † Turricula waitaraensis Marwick, 1926: synonym of † Thatcheria waitaraensis (Marwick, 1926)

== Taxa inquirenda ==
Further investigation needed:

- Surcula aditus Barnard, 1969
- Surcula bouvieri Jousseaume, 1898
- Surcula urnula Thiele, 1925
