= Turricula profundorum =

Scientific classification
- Kingdom: Animalia
- Phylum: Mollusca
- Class: Gastropoda
- Subclass: Caenogastropoda
- Order: Neogastropoda
- Superfamily: Conoidea
- Family: Clavatulidae
- Genus: Turricula
- Species: T. profundorum

Binomial name
- Turricula profundorum (E.A. Smith, 1896)

Synonyms
- Pleurotoma (Surcula) profundorum E.A. Smith, 1896

Species of gastropod

Turricula profundorum is a species of sea snail, a marine gastropod mollusk in the family Clavatulidae.

== Description ==
The length of the shell is around 34 mm, with a diameter 12 mm.

The white shell has a fusiform shape. The length of the narrow aperture equals almost half of the length of the shell. The labral sinus is broad, rather deep and situated at the suture. The suture is adpressed.

It is related to and differs from Turricula navarchus in the strongly developed, but relatively sparse peripheral nodes.

== Distribution ==
This species occurs in the Indian Ocean in deep water off the Maldives.
