= Turricula subelegans =

Scientific classification
- Kingdom: Animalia
- Phylum: Mollusca
- Class: Gastropoda
- Subclass: Caenogastropoda
- Order: Neogastropoda
- Superfamily: Conoidea
- Family: Clavatulidae
- Genus: Turricula
- Species: T. subelegans

Binomial name
- Turricula subelegans (d'Orbigny, 1850)

Synonyms
- † Pleurotoma subelegans d'Orbigny, 1850 superseded combination; † Turricula (Surcula) subelegans (d'Orbigny, 1850) superseded combination

Species of gastropod

Turricula subelegans is an extinct species of sea snail, a marine gastropod mollusk in the family Clavatulidae.

== Distribution ==
Fossils of this marine species were found in Eocene strata in Picardy, France
