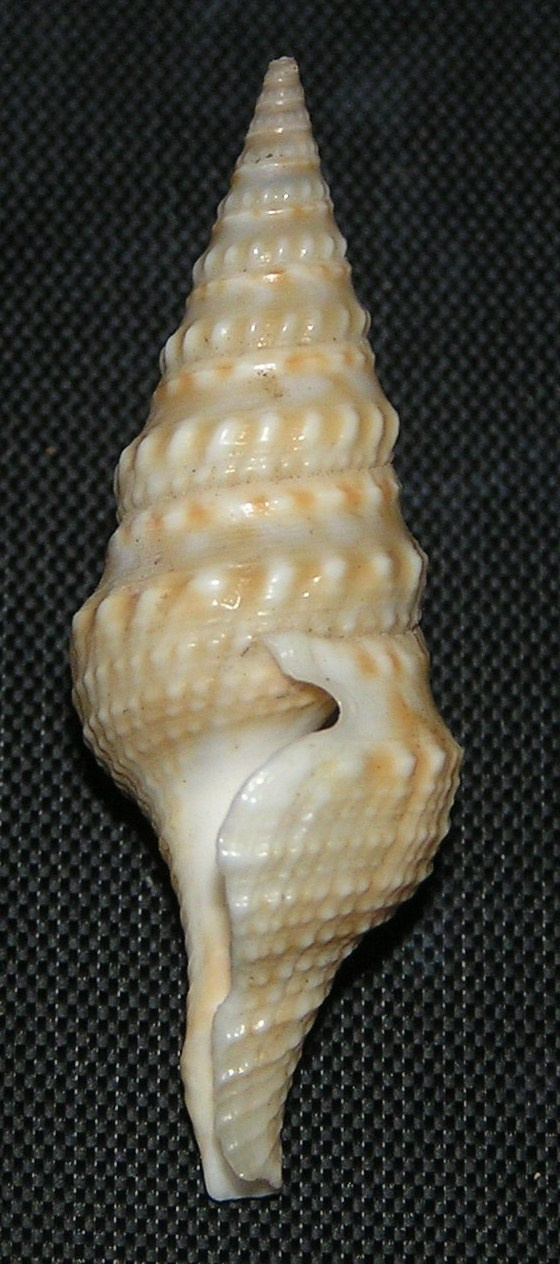
- Apertural view of a shell of Turricula nelliae

Scientific classification
- Kingdom: Animalia
- Phylum: Mollusca
- Class: Gastropoda
- Subclass: Caenogastropoda
- Order: Neogastropoda
- Superfamily: Conoidea
- Family: Clavatulidae
- Genus: Turricula
- Species: T. nelliae

Binomial name
- Turricula nelliae (E.A. Smith, 1877)

Synonyms
- Pleurotoma nelliae E.A. Smith, 1877

= Turricula nelliae =

Species of gastropod

Turricula nelliae is a species of sea snail, a marine gastropod mollusk in the family Clavatulidae.

There is one subspecies: Turricula nelliae spuria (Hedley, 1922) (synonyms: Pleurotoma tuberculata Gray, 1839, Pleurotoma punctata Reeve, 1845; Inquisitor spurius Hedley, 1922). It differs from Turicula nelliae nelliae by a flexed anterior canal and having 14–17 peripheral nodes per whorl.

== Description ==
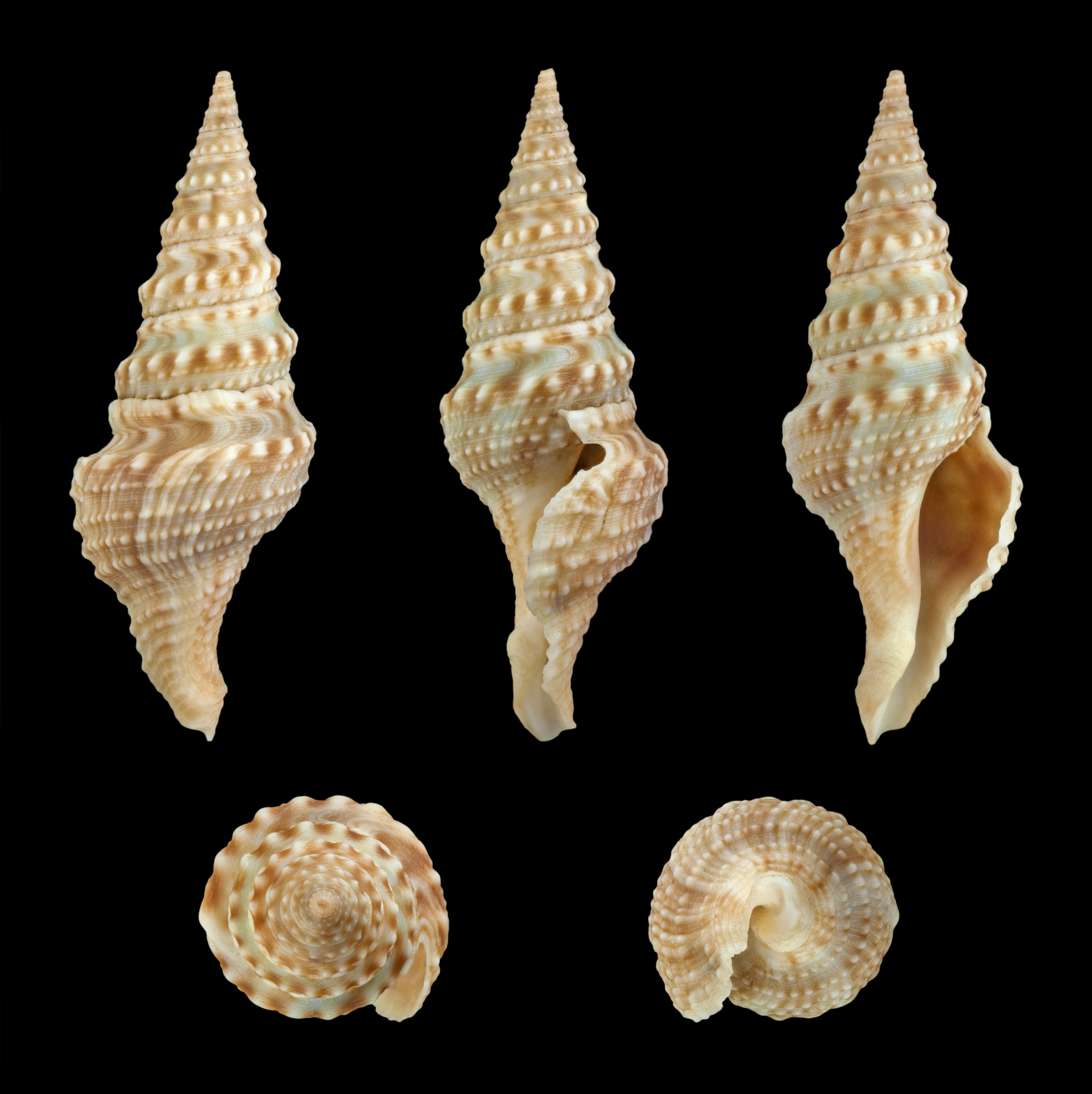
Turricula nelliae spuria (Hedley, 1922)

The size of an adult shell varies between 30 mm and 40 mm.

The turreted shell has a fusiform shape. It contains 12 strongly excavated whorls. A species of charming form and purity, with whorls strongly excavated above, and a row of upright oblong tubercles encircling their bases, and two small contiguous keels around them just below the suture. The basal spirals are numerous and plain. The aperture together with the siphonal canal equals almost half the length of the shell. The anterior canal is straight. The upper part of the thin outer lip is slightly incised. The siphonal canal is slightly oblique and recurved backwards.

== Distribution ==
This species has a wide distribution in the Indian Ocean, and from China to Australia (Northern Territory, Queensland, Western Australia).
