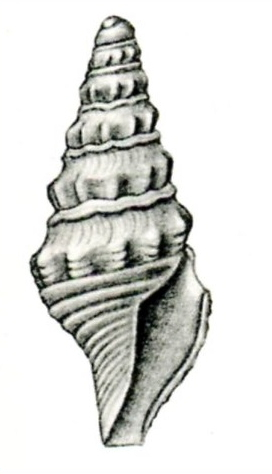
- Original drawing of a shell of Turricula aethiopica

Scientific classification
- Kingdom: Animalia
- Phylum: Mollusca
- Class: Gastropoda
- Subclass: Caenogastropoda
- Order: Neogastropoda
- Superfamily: Conoidea
- Family: Clavatulidae
- Genus: Turricula
- Species: T. aethiopica

Binomial name
- Turricula aethiopica (Thiele, 1925)

Synonyms
- Surcula aethiopica Thiele, 1925

= Turricula aethiopica =

Species of gastropod

Turricula aethiopica is a species of sea snail, a marine gastropod mollusk in the family Clavatulidae.

== Distribution ==
This species occurs in the Indian Ocean off Somalia and Madagascar.
