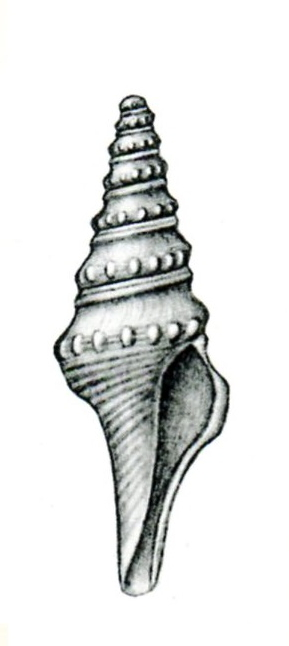
- Original drawing of a shell of Turricula gemmulaeformis

Scientific classification
- Kingdom: Animalia
- Phylum: Mollusca
- Class: Gastropoda
- Subclass: Caenogastropoda
- Order: Neogastropoda
- Superfamily: Conoidea
- Family: Clavatulidae
- Genus: Turricula
- Species: T. gemmulaeformis

Binomial name
- Turricula gemmulaeformis (Thiele, 1925)

Synonyms
- Surcula gemmulaeformis Thiele, 1925

= Turricula gemmulaeformis =

Species of gastropod

Turricula gemmulaeformis is a species of sea snail, a marine gastropod mollusk in the family Clavatulidae.

== Description ==
The length of the shell attains 10 mm, its diameter 3.25 mm.

== Distribution ==
This marine species occurs off Sumatra.
