= Turricula sobrinaeformis =

Scientific classification
- Kingdom: Animalia
- Phylum: Mollusca
- Class: Gastropoda
- Subclass: Caenogastropoda
- Order: Neogastropoda
- Superfamily: Conoidea
- Family: Clavatulidae
- Genus: Turricula
- Species: †T. sobrinaeformis

Binomial name
- †Turricula sobrinaeformis S. Nomura, 1937

Synonyms
- † Comitas sobrinaeformis S. Nomura, 1937

Extinct species of gastropod

Turricula sobrinaeformis is an extinct species of sea snail, a marine gastropod mollusc in the family Clavatulidae.

== Distribution ==
Fossils of this species were found in Pliocene strata in Japan.
