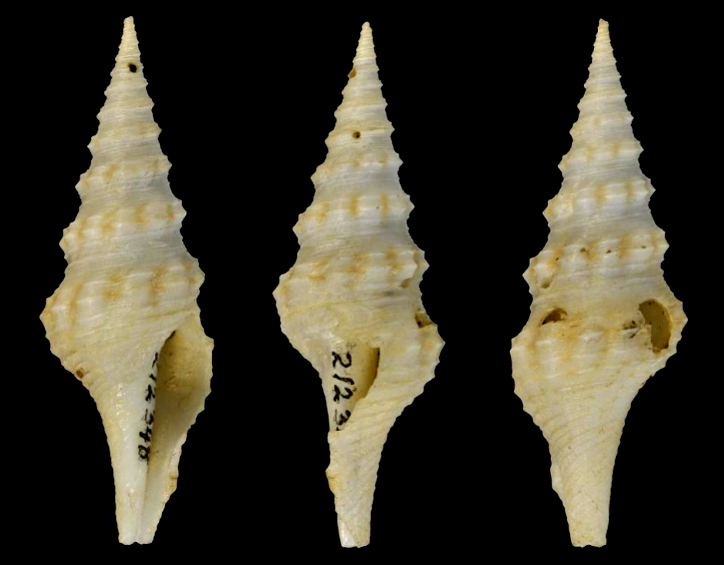
- Shell of Turricula panthea (holotype)

Scientific classification
- Kingdom: Animalia
- Phylum: Mollusca
- Class: Gastropoda
- Subclass: Caenogastropoda
- Order: Neogastropoda
- Superfamily: Conoidea
- Family: Clavatulidae
- Genus: Turricula
- Species: T. panthea

Binomial name
- Turricula panthea W.H. Dall, 1919

Synonyms
- Turricula (Surcula) panthea W. H. Dall, 1919 (original combination)

= Turricula panthea =

Species of gastropod

Turricula panthea is a species of sea snail, a marine gastropod mollusk in the family Clavatulidae.

== Description ==
The length of the holotype (without protoconch) is 47 mm; its diameter 17.5 mm.

(Original description) The solid shell is acute and fusiform. Its color is white, with pale brown blotches between the ribs (the protoconch lost). The shell contains about 14 whorls. The suture is closely appressed, obscure with a rounded thread in front of it. The anal fasciole, close to the suture, is slightly depressed, spirally threaded and arcuately striated.

The spiral sculpture on the early whorls consists of a peripheral keel with one strong thread behind it, the rest of the surface finely closely spirally threaded. The last three or four whorls are peripherally waved with narrower interspaces over which the keel and thread are a little swollen, the fine threading continuing. The space in front of the keel on the body whorl shows about 25 strong cords with wider interspaces. The aperture is narrow. The anal sulcus is distinct, without a subsutural callus. The thin outer lip is produced and smooth inside. The inner lip has a thin wash of enamel. The columella is straight. The siphonal canal is long, narrow, with no siphonal fasciole or recurvation.

== Distribution ==
This marine species occurs in the North Pacific Ocean off Panama.
