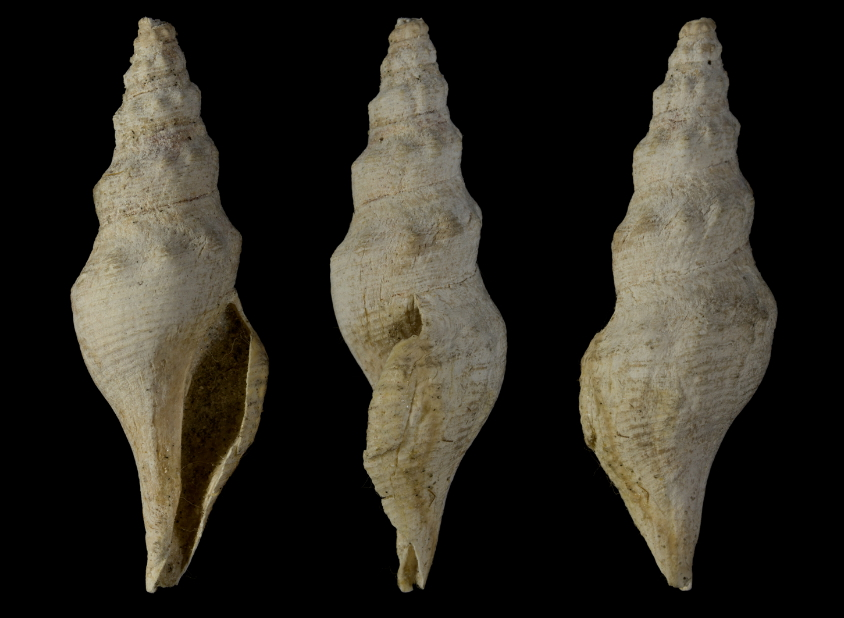
- Shell of † Turricula veslensis (specimen at MNHN, Paris)

Scientific classification
- Kingdom: Animalia
- Phylum: Mollusca
- Class: Gastropoda
- Subclass: Caenogastropoda
- Order: Neogastropoda
- Superfamily: Conoidea
- Family: Clavatulidae
- Genus: Turricula
- Species: T. veslensis

Binomial name
- Turricula veslensis (Cossmann, 1899)

Synonyms
- † Surcula veslensis Cossmann, 1899 superseded combination; † Turricula (Surcula) veslensis (Cossmann, 1899) superseded combination

= Turricula veslensis =

Species of gastropod

Turricula veslensis is an extinct species of sea snail, a marine gastropod mollusk in the family Clavatulidae.

== Distribution ==
Fossils of this marine species were found in Paleocene strata in Champagne-Ardenne, France
