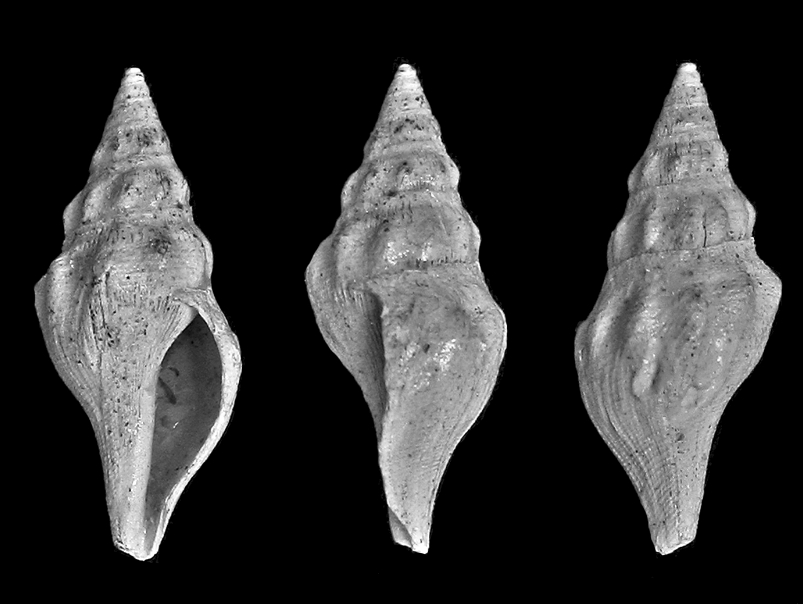
- Shell of † Turricula plateaui (specimen at MNHN, Paris)

Scientific classification
- Kingdom: Animalia
- Phylum: Mollusca
- Class: Gastropoda
- Subclass: Caenogastropoda
- Order: Neogastropoda
- Superfamily: Conoidea
- Family: Clavatulidae
- Genus: Turricula
- Species: T. plateaui

Binomial name
- Turricula plateaui (Cossmann, 1889)

Synonyms
- † Pleurotoma plateaui Cossmann, 1889 superseded combination; † Surcula plateaui (Cossmann, 1889); † Turricula (Crenaturricula) plateaui (Cossmann, 1889) superseded combination

= Turricula plateaui =

Species of gastropod

Turricula plateaui is an extinct species of sea snail, a marine gastropod mollusk in the family Clavatulidae.

== Description ==
The length of the shell attains 37 mm, its diameter 13 mm.

== Distribution ==
Fossils of this marine species were found in Paleocene strata in Champagne-Ardenne, France
