= Turricula lepidota =

Scientific classification
- Kingdom: Animalia
- Phylum: Mollusca
- Class: Gastropoda
- Subclass: Caenogastropoda
- Order: Neogastropoda
- Superfamily: Conoidea
- Family: Clavatulidae
- Genus: Turricula
- Species: †T. lepidota

Binomial name
- †Turricula lepidota (K. Martin, 1914)

Synonyms
- † Surcula lepidota K. Martin, 1914; † Turricula (Crenaturricula) lepidota (Martin, 1914)

Species of gastropod

Turricula lepidota is an extinct species of sea snail, a marine gastropod mollusk in the family Clavatulidae.

== Distribution ==
Fossils of this marine species were found in Eocene strata in Java, Indonesia.
