= Turricula textiliosa =

Scientific classification
- Kingdom: Animalia
- Phylum: Mollusca
- Class: Gastropoda
- Subclass: Caenogastropoda
- Order: Neogastropoda
- Superfamily: Conoidea
- Family: Clavatulidae
- Genus: Turricula
- Species: T. textiliosa

Binomial name
- Turricula textiliosa (Deshayes, 1834)

Synonyms
- † Pleurotoma textiliosa Deshayes, 1834 superseded combination; † Surcula textiliosa (Deshayes, 1834); † Turricula (Crenaturricula) textiliosa (Deshayes, 1834) superseded combination

Species of gastropod

Turricula textiliosa is an extinct species of sea snail, a marine gastropod mollusk in the family Clavatulidae.

== Distribution ==
Fossils of this marine species were found in Eocene strata in Picardy, France
