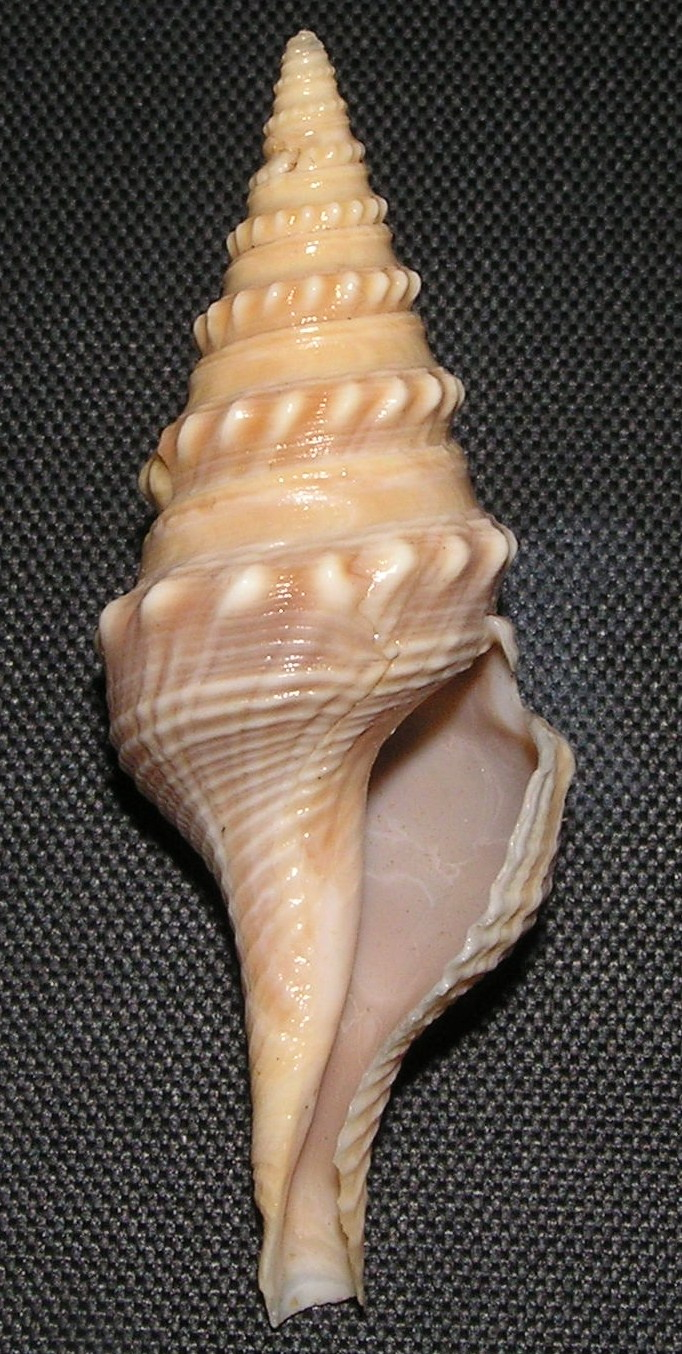
- Apertural view of a shell of Turricula javana

Scientific classification
- Kingdom: Animalia
- Phylum: Mollusca
- Class: Gastropoda
- Subclass: Caenogastropoda
- Order: Neogastropoda
- Superfamily: Conoidea
- Family: Clavatulidae
- Genus: Turricula
- Species: T. javana

Binomial name
- Turricula javana (Linnaeus, 1767)

Synonyms
- Murex javanus Linnaeus, 1767 (basionym); Murex turris Gmelin, 1791; Pleurotoma contorta G. Perry, 1811; Pleurotoma javana Lamarck, 1816; Pleurotoma nodifera Lamarck, 1822; Pleurotoma spuria Link, 1807; Surcula javana (Linnaeus, 1767); Turricula flammea Schumacher, 1817; Turris nodifera (Lamarck, 1822) (combination of M.Smith, 1940)

= Turricula javana =

Species of gastropod

Turricula javana, common name the Java turrid, is a species of sea snail, a marine gastropod mollusk in the family Clavatulidae.

== Description ==
The size of an adult shell varies between 35 mm and 70 mm. The whorls are angular and tuberculated in the middle. These tubercles develop from more or less indistinct oblique folds or ribs, everywhere closely encircled by striae. The color of the shell is light yellowish brown, the tubercles lighter.

== Distribution ==
This marine species has a wide distribution going from East Africa and Pakistan to Queensland, Australia; off Vietnam and in the South China Sea.
