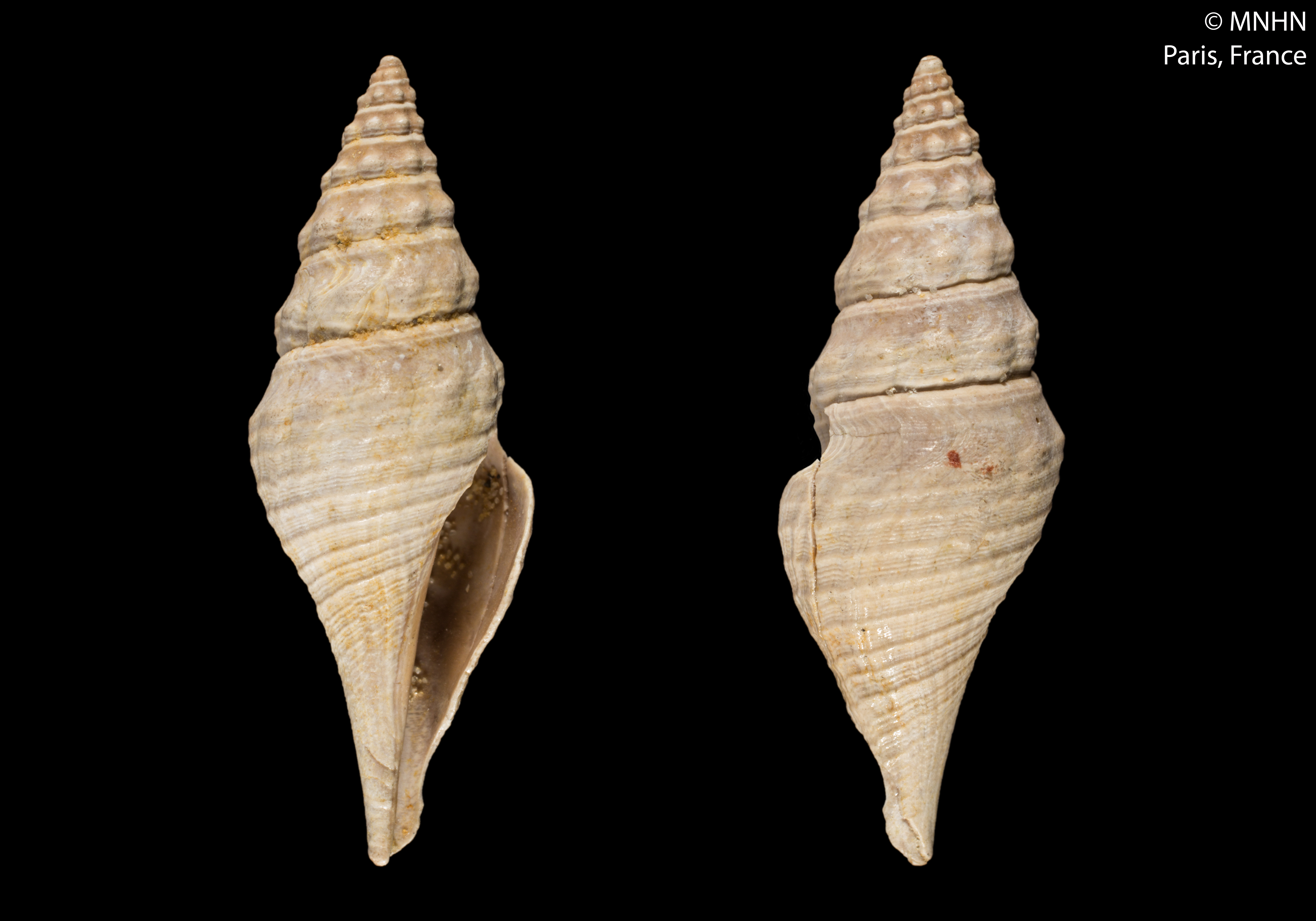
- Shell of † Turricula barretti (holotype at MNHN, Paris)

Scientific classification
- Kingdom: Animalia
- Phylum: Mollusca
- Class: Gastropoda
- Subclass: Caenogastropoda
- Order: Neogastropoda
- Superfamily: Conoidea
- Family: Clavatulidae
- Genus: Turricula
- Species: T. barreti

Binomial name
- Turricula barreti (de Boury, 1899)

Synonyms
- † Pleurotoma barreti de Boury, 1899 (original combination); † Turricula (Crenaturricula) barreti (de Boury, 1899) alternate representation; † Turricula (Crenaturricula) bouryi Glibert, 1960 (unnecessary replacement name for Pleurotoma barreti de Boury, 1899)

= Turricula barreti =

Species of gastropod

Turricula barreti is an extinct species of sea snail, a marine gastropod mollusk in the family Clavatulidae.

== Description ==
The length of the shell attains 29 mm, its diameter 8.5 mm.

(Original description in French) The elongated, ventricose shell contains eight to ten whorls. The protoconch, which is broken on the holotype, is obtuse and has the form of a proboscis.

The following whorls are moderately convex and separated by a shallow, but wide open suture. At their upper part, they carry a slightly accentuated sloping ramp surmounted, near the suture, by two cords. The first whorls are adorned with nodular tubercles which soon fade and even disappear on the body whorl which only bears a kind of obtuse chain located on the angle which limits the ramp. This one is covered with very tight and wavy cords.

Between the ramp and the lower suture, the tubercles which, except on the first whorls, stop at this ramp, are cut by three undulating decurrent cords, the first of which occupies the angle. Between these are distinguished small, very thin, very tight, very undulating coronets, similar to those of the ramp. The base of the shell bears similar ornamentation. The main cords are about fifteen in number and stop at a certain distance from the end of the siphonal canal which then only carries secondary cords.

The body whorl is very large in proportion. It has a fairly narrow opening, terminating in a long, narrow, barely twisted siphonal canal. The sinuses are wide and deep . The convex outer lip is very prominent.

== Distribution ==
Fossils of this marine species were found in Eocene strata in Ile-de-France, France
