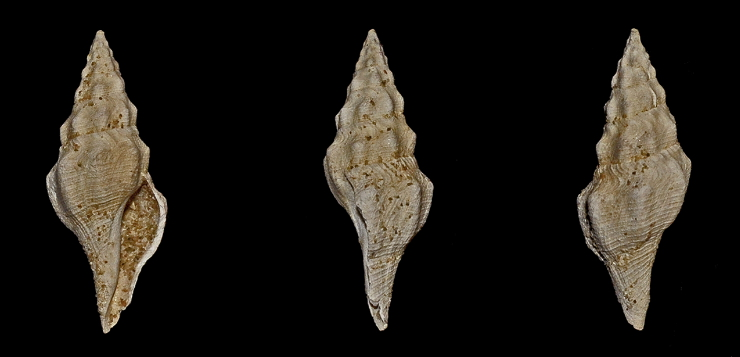
- Shell of † Turricula polycesta (specimen at MNHN, Paris)

Scientific classification
- Kingdom: Animalia
- Phylum: Mollusca
- Class: Gastropoda
- Subclass: Caenogastropoda
- Order: Neogastropoda
- Superfamily: Conoidea
- Family: Clavatulidae
- Genus: Turricula
- Species: T. polycesta

Binomial name
- Turricula polycesta (Bayan, 1873)

Synonyms
- † Pleurotoma polycesta Bayan, 1873 superseded combination; Surcula polycesta (Bayan, 1873); † Turricula (Crenaturricula) polycesta (Bayan, 1873) superseded combination

= Turricula polycesta =

Species of gastropod

Turricula polycesta is an extinct species of sea snail, a marine gastropod mollusk in the family Clavatulidae.

== Distribution ==
Fossils of this marine species were found in Eocene strata in Picardy, France
