= Trachydrillia denizi =

Scientific classification
- Kingdom: Animalia
- Phylum: Mollusca
- Class: Gastropoda
- Subclass: Caenogastropoda
- Order: Neogastropoda
- Superfamily: Conoidea
- Family: Clavatulidae
- Genus: Trachydrillia
- Species: T. denizi

Binomial name
- Trachydrillia denizi Nolf & Swinnen, 2010

Species of gastropod

Trachydrillia denizi is a species of sea snail, a marine gastropod mollusk in the family Clavatulidae.

== Distribution ==
This marine species occurs off Senegal.
