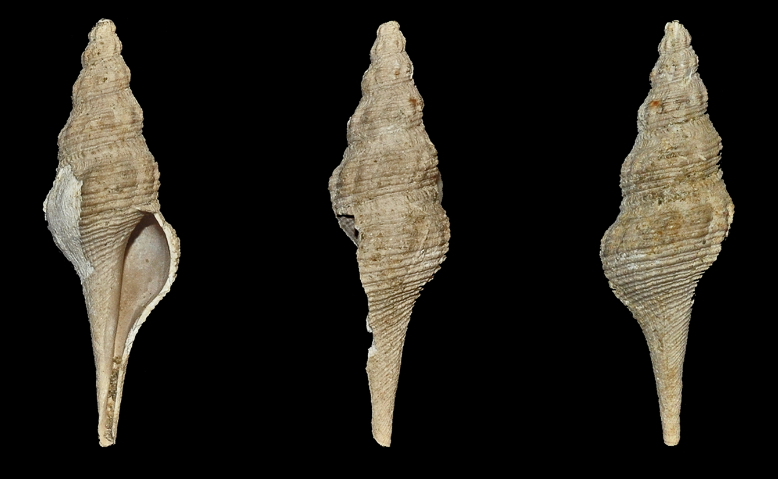
- Shell of † Turricula vaudini (specimen at MNHN, Paris)

Scientific classification
- Kingdom: Animalia
- Phylum: Mollusca
- Class: Gastropoda
- Subclass: Caenogastropoda
- Order: Neogastropoda
- Superfamily: Conoidea
- Family: Clavatulidae
- Genus: Turricula
- Species: T. vaudini

Binomial name
- Turricula vaudini (Deshayes, 1865)

Synonyms
- † Pleurotoma vaudini Deshayes, 1865 superseded combination; † Surcula monilifera (Melleville, 1843); † Surcula vaudini (Deshayes, 1865); † Turricula (Surcula) vaudini (Deshayes, 1865) superseded combination

= Turricula vaudini =

Species of gastropod

Turricula vaudini is an extinct species of sea snail, a marine gastropod mollusk in the family Clavatulidae.

== Distribution ==
Fossils of this marine species were found in Eocene strata in Picardy, France
