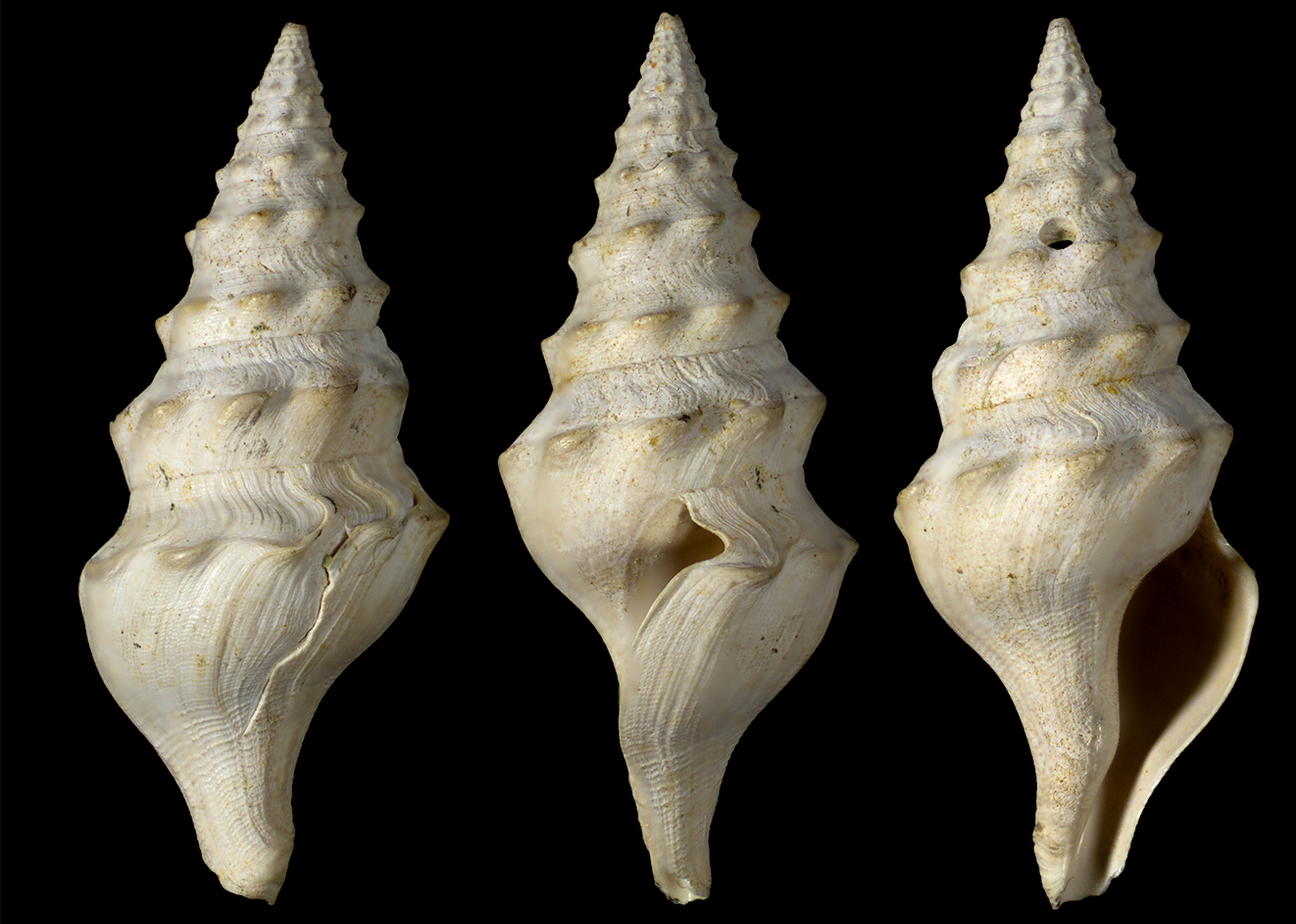
- Shell of † Turricula brevicauda (specimen at MNHN, Paris)

Scientific classification
- Kingdom: Animalia
- Phylum: Mollusca
- Class: Gastropoda
- Subclass: Caenogastropoda
- Order: Neogastropoda
- Superfamily: Conoidea
- Family: Clavatulidae
- Genus: Turricula
- Species: †T. brevicauda

Binomial name
- †Turricula brevicauda (Deshayes, 1834)

Synonyms
- † Drillia brevicauda (Deshayes, 1834); † Pleurotoma brevicauda Deshayes, 1834 superseded combination; † Turricula (Crenaturricula) brevicauda (Deshayes, 1834) unaccepted > superseded combination

= Turricula brevicauda =

Species of gastropod

Turricula brevicauda is an extinct species of sea snail, a marine gastropod mollusk in the family Clavatulidae.

== Distribution ==
Fossils of this marine species have been discovered in Eocene strata in Ile-de-France, France.
