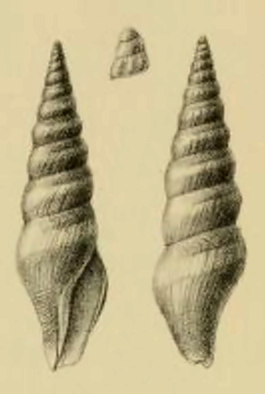

Scientific classification
- Kingdom: Animalia
- Phylum: Mollusca
- Class: Gastropoda
- Subclass: Caenogastropoda
- Order: Neogastropoda
- Superfamily: Conoidea
- Family: Clavatulidae
- Genus: Turricula
- Species: T. turriplana

Binomial name
- Turricula turriplana (Sowerby III, 1903)

Synonyms
- Clavatula turriplana (G.B. Sowerby III, 1903); Pleurotoma turriplana Sowerby III, 1903

= Turricula turriplana =

Species of gastropod

Turricula turriplana is a species of sea snail, a marine gastropod mollusk in the family Clavatulidae.

== Description ==
The length of the shell attains 42 mm, its diameter 11mm.

The shell is elongately turreted. Its color is light brown, with a whitish band in the middle of the whorls. The spire is long and acutely turreted. It contains 12 whorls. The first two whorls are smooth, rounded, forming a somewhat prominent white papillary apex. The other whorls are slopingly convex, slightly impressed below the suture, spirally faintly grooved, obliquely obscurely plicated. The body whorl measures about 2.5ths of the entire length of the shell. It is convex above, attenuated towards the base, scarcely rostrate, nearly smooth with spiral grooves (only visible with a lens) that are irregular and broken up. The oblique wrinkles are almost obsolete. The aperture is rather long and moderately wide. Its interior is tinged with pale pink. The white columella is rather straight and very slightly flexuose. The outer lip is sharp, with a broad posterior sinus, situated between the angle and the suture.

== Distribution ==
This marine species occurs off the Cape Province, South Africa.
