= Turricula sulcicancellata =

Scientific classification
- Kingdom: Animalia
- Phylum: Mollusca
- Class: Gastropoda
- Subclass: Caenogastropoda
- Order: Neogastropoda
- Superfamily: Conoidea
- Family: Clavatulidae
- Genus: Turricula
- Species: T. sulcicancellata

Binomial name
- Turricula sulcicancellata (Barnard, 1958)

Synonyms
- Surcula sulcicancellata Barnard, 1958

Species of gastropod

Turricula sulcicancellata is a species of sea snail, a marine gastropod mollusk in the family Clavatulidae.

== Distribution ==
This marine species occurs off Cape Point, South Africa.
