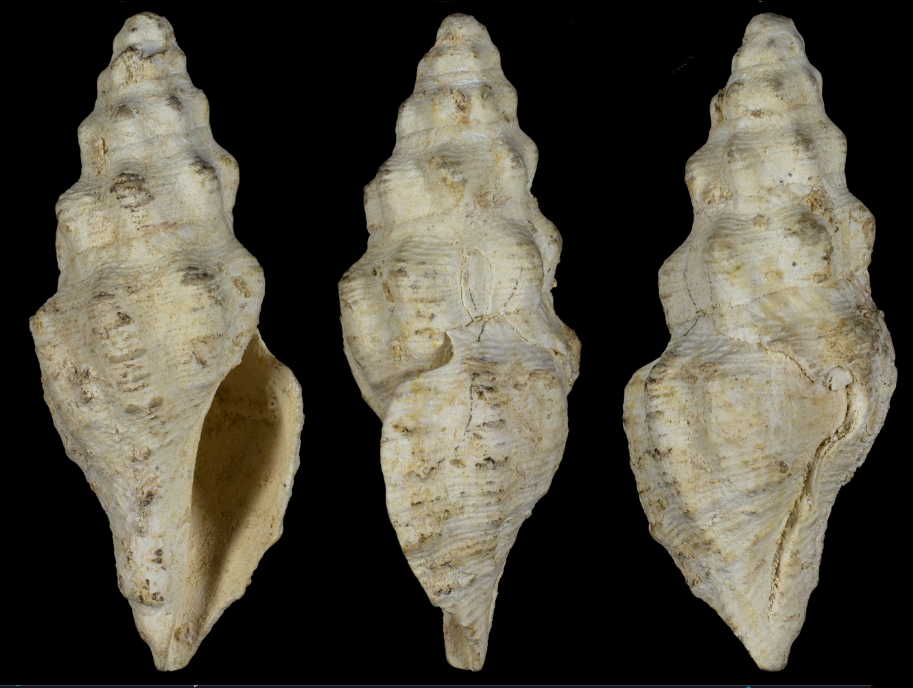
- Shell of † Turricula catenata (specimen at MNHN, Paris)

Scientific classification
- Kingdom: Animalia
- Phylum: Mollusca
- Class: Gastropoda
- Subclass: Caenogastropoda
- Order: Neogastropoda
- Superfamily: Conoidea
- Family: Clavatulidae
- Genus: Turricula
- Species: †T. catenata

Binomial name
- †Turricula catenata (Deshayes, 1834)

Synonyms
- † Pleurotoma catenata Lamarck, 1804 superseded combination; † Turricula (Catenotoma) catenata (Lamarck, 1804) superseded combination

= Turricula catenata =

Species of gastropod

Turricula catenata is an extinct species of sea snail, a marine gastropod mollusk in the family Clavatulidae.

== Distribution ==
Fossils of this marine species were found in Eocene strata in Picardie, France
