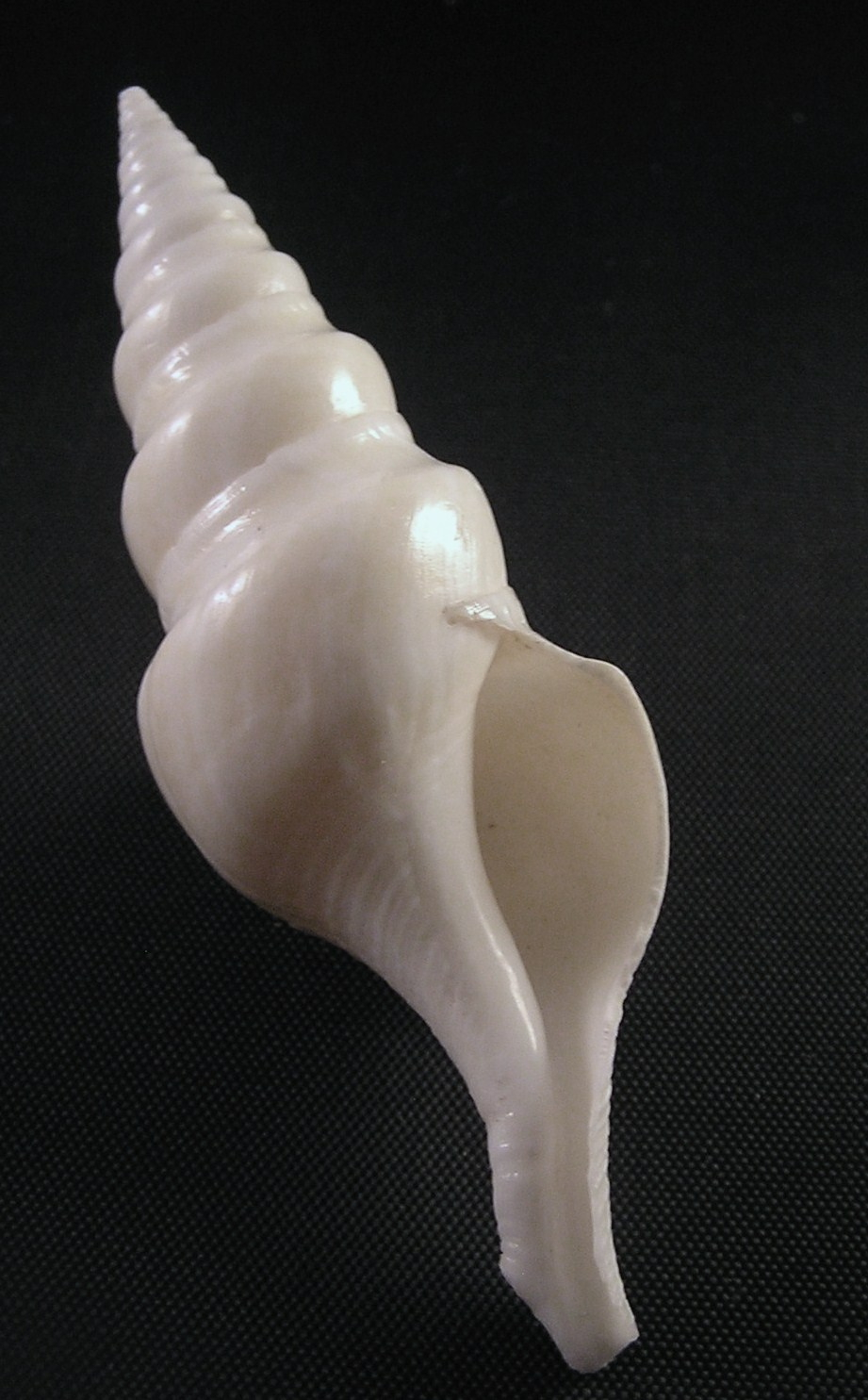
- Apertural view of a shell of Turricula tornata

Scientific classification
- Kingdom: Animalia
- Phylum: Mollusca
- Class: Gastropoda
- Subclass: Caenogastropoda
- Order: Neogastropoda
- Superfamily: Conoidea
- Family: Clavatulidae
- Genus: Turricula
- Species: T. tornata

Binomial name
- Turricula tornata (Dillwyn, 1817)

Synonyms
- Murex tornatus Dillwyn, 1817; Pleurotoma candida Menke, K.T., 1829; Surcula tornata Dillwyn, 1817; Turricula flammea Schumacher, H.C.F., 1817; Turricula javana Chemnitz, J.H.

= Turricula tornata =

Species of gastropod

Turricula tornata, common name the turned turrid, is a species of sea snail, a marine gastropod mollusk in the family Clavatulidae.

== Description ==
The size of an adult shell varies between 60 mm and 75 mm.

The shell is smooth and ivory-like. The lower portion of body whorl shows revolving striae. The upper portion of the whorls are broadly, concavely channeled. The anal sinus is broad and shallow. The siphonal canal is long. The color of the shell is whitish or yellowish, flexuously strigated with light brown.

== Distribution ==
This species has a wide distribution : from the Red Sea to Thailand and the Western Pacific.
