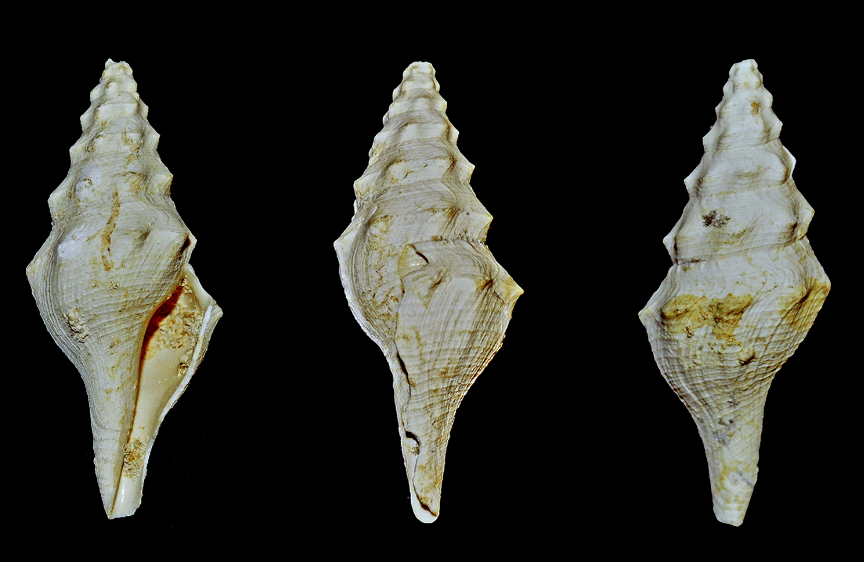
- Shell of † Turricula mauritii (specimen at MNHN, Paris)

Scientific classification
- Kingdom: Animalia
- Phylum: Mollusca
- Class: Gastropoda
- Subclass: Caenogastropoda
- Order: Neogastropoda
- Superfamily: Conoidea
- Family: Clavatulidae
- Genus: Turricula
- Species: T. mauritii

Binomial name
- Turricula mauritii (de Boury, 1899)

Synonyms
- † Pleurotoma mauritii de Boury, 1899; † Turricula (Surcula) mauritii (de Boury, 1899) superseded combination

= Turricula mauritii =

Species of gastropod

Turricula mauritii is an extinct species of sea snail, a marine gastropod mollusk in the family Clavatulidae.

== Distribution ==
Fossils of this marine species were found in Eocene strata in Picardy, France
