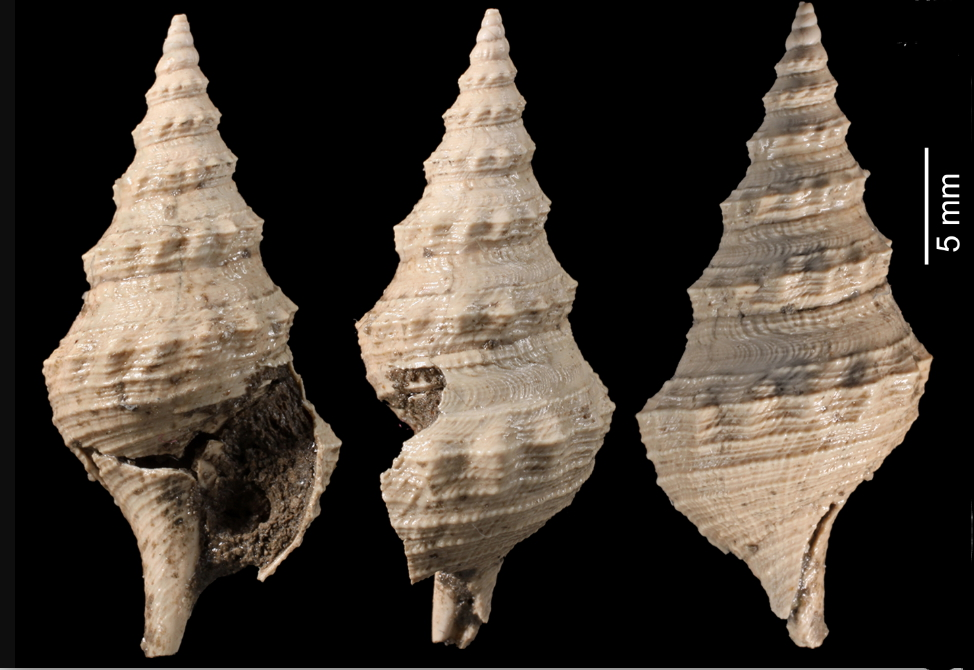
- Shell of † Turricula sanctistephani (holotype at MNHN, Paris)

Scientific classification
- Kingdom: Animalia
- Phylum: Mollusca
- Class: Gastropoda
- Subclass: Caenogastropoda
- Order: Neogastropoda
- Superfamily: Conoidea
- Family: Clavatulidae
- Genus: Turricula
- Species: T. sanctistephani

Binomial name
- Turricula sanctistephani Lozouet, 2017

= Turricula sanctistephani =

Species of gastropod

Turricula sanctistephani is an extinct species of sea snail, a marine gastropod mollusk in the family Clavatulidae.

== Distribution ==
Fossils of this marine species were found in Oligocene strata in Southwest France
