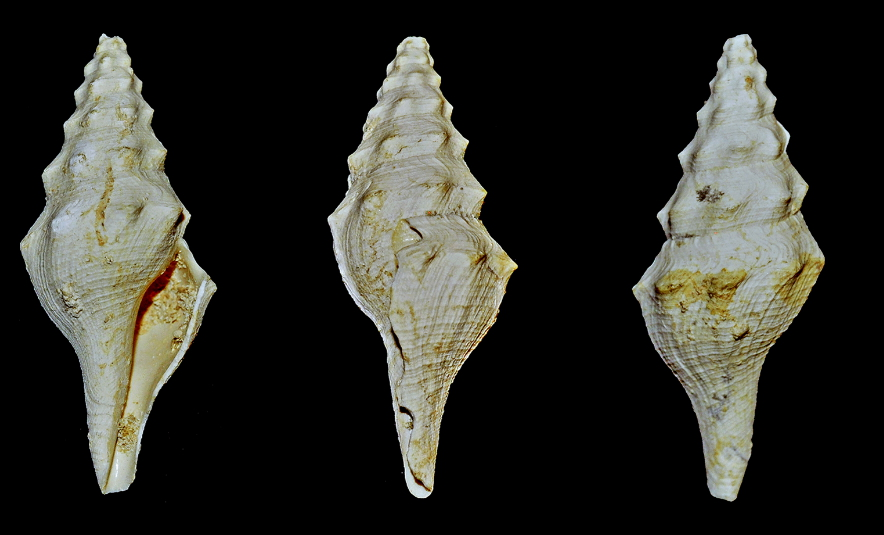
- Shell of † Turricula michelini (specimen at MNHN, Paris)

Scientific classification
- Kingdom: Animalia
- Phylum: Mollusca
- Class: Gastropoda
- Subclass: Caenogastropoda
- Order: Neogastropoda
- Superfamily: Conoidea
- Family: Clavatulidae
- Genus: Turricula
- Species: T. michelini

Binomial name
- Turricula michelini (Deshayes, 1865)

Synonyms
- † Pleurotoma michelini Deshayes, 1865 superseded combination; † Surcula michelini (Deshayes, 1865); † Turricula (Crenaturricula) michelini (Deshayes, 1865) superseded combination

= Turricula michelini =

Species of gastropod

Turricula michelini is an extinct species of sea snail, a marine gastropod mollusk in the family Clavatulidae.

== Distribution ==
Fossils of this marine species were found in Eocene strata in Picardy, France
