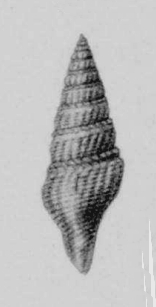
- Shell of † Turricula sultani (holotype)

Scientific classification
- Kingdom: Animalia
- Phylum: Mollusca
- Class: Gastropoda
- Subclass: Caenogastropoda
- Order: Neogastropoda
- Superfamily: Conoidea
- Family: Clavatulidae
- Genus: Turricula
- Species: T. sultani

Binomial name
- Turricula sultani (K. Martin, 1914)

Synonyms
- † Drillia sultani K. Martin, 1914; † Turricula (Nangulanica) sultani (Martin, 1914)

= Turricula sultani =

Species of gastropod

Turricula sultani is an extinct species of sea snail, a marine gastropod mollusk in the family Clavatulidae.

== Distribution ==
Fossils of this marine species were found in Eocene strata in Java, Indonesia
