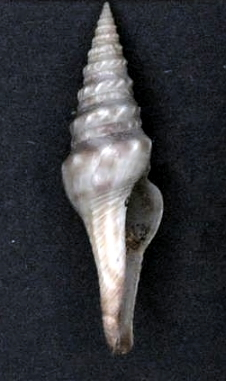
- Apertural view of a shell of Turricula catena (museum specimen at Naturalis Biodiversity Center)

Scientific classification
- Kingdom: Animalia
- Phylum: Mollusca
- Class: Gastropoda
- Subclass: Caenogastropoda
- Order: Neogastropoda
- Superfamily: Conoidea
- Family: Clavatulidae
- Genus: Turricula
- Species: T. catena

Binomial name
- Turricula catena (Reeve, 1843)

Synonyms
- Pleurotoma catena Reeve, 1843

= Turricula catena =

Species of gastropod

Turricula catena is a species of sea snail, a marine gastropod mollusk in the family Clavatulidae.

== Distribution ==
This species occurs in the Red Sea.
