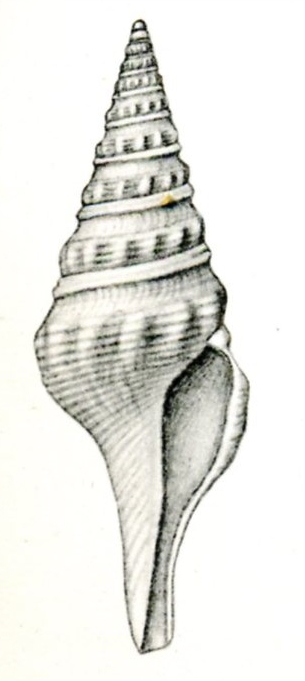
- Original drawing of a shell of Turricula sumatrana

Scientific classification
- Kingdom: Animalia
- Phylum: Mollusca
- Class: Gastropoda
- Subclass: Caenogastropoda
- Order: Neogastropoda
- Superfamily: Conoidea
- Family: Clavatulidae
- Genus: Turricula
- Species: T. sumatrana

Binomial name
- Turricula sumatrana (Thiele, 1925)

Synonyms
- Surcula sumatrana Thiele, 1925

= Turricula sumatrana =

Species of gastropod

Turricula sumatrana is a species of sea snail, a marine gastropod mollusk in the family Clavatulidae.

== Distribution ==
This marine species occurs along West Sumatra.
