= Turricula faurei =

Scientific classification
- Kingdom: Animalia
- Phylum: Mollusca
- Class: Gastropoda
- Subclass: Caenogastropoda
- Order: Neogastropoda
- Superfamily: Conoidea
- Family: Clavatulidae
- Genus: Turricula
- Species: T. faurei

Binomial name
- Turricula faurei (Barnard, 1958)

Synonyms
- Surcula faurei Barnard, 1958

Species of gastropod

Turricula faurei is a species of sea snail, a marine gastropod mollusk in the family Clavatulidae.

== Description ==
The length of the shell attains 21 mm, its diameter 9.3 mm.

== Distribution ==
This marine species occurs off the Agulhas Bank, South Africa.
