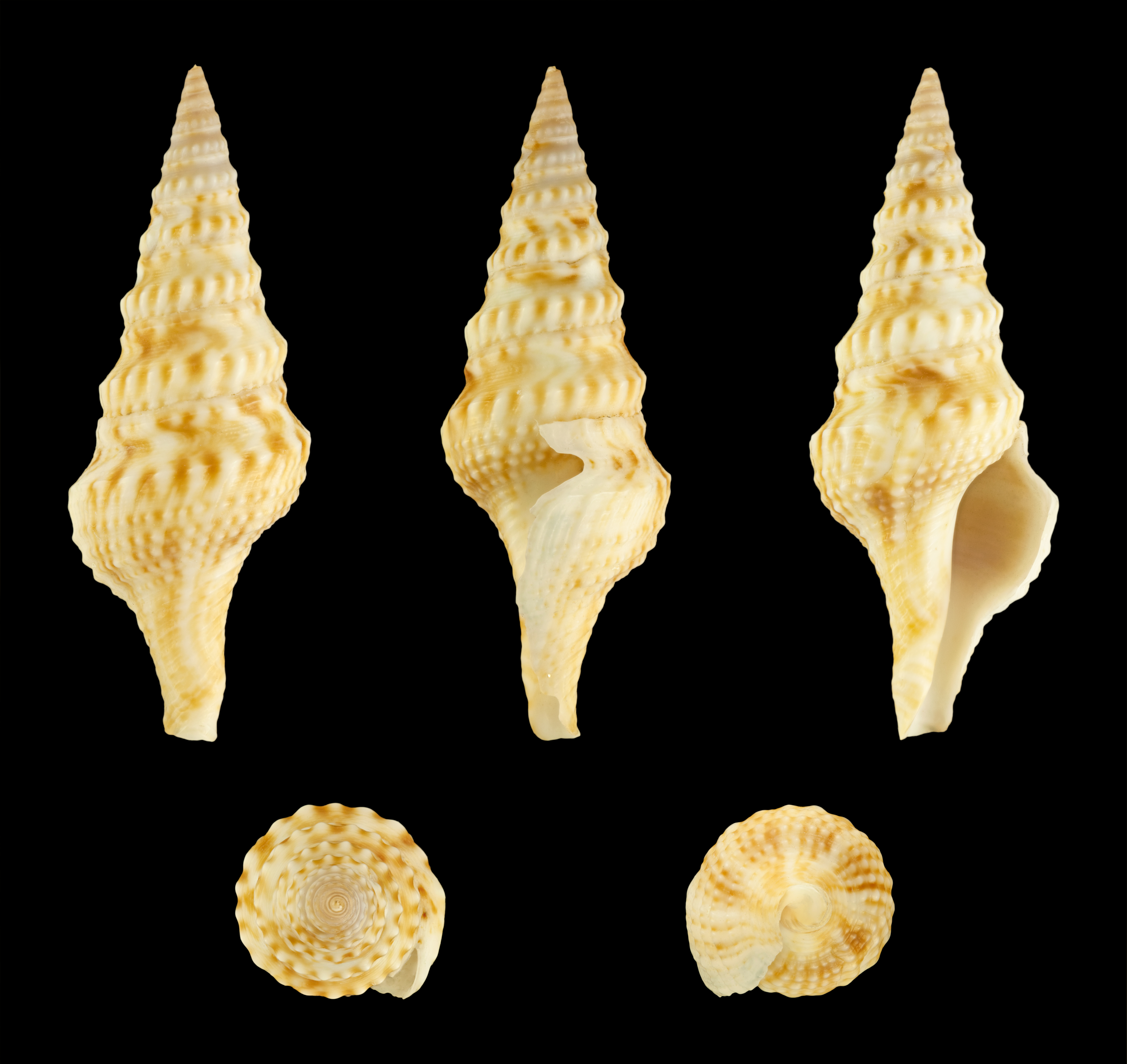
- A shell of Turricula granobalteus

Scientific classification
- Kingdom: Animalia
- Phylum: Mollusca
- Class: Gastropoda
- Subclass: Caenogastropoda
- Order: Neogastropoda
- Superfamily: Conoidea
- Family: Clavatulidae
- Genus: Turricula
- Species: T. granobalteus

Binomial name
- Turricula granobalteus (Hedley, 1922)

Synonyms
- Drillia putilla Brazier, 1876; Inquisitor granobalteus Hedley, 1922; Turricula nelliae granobalteus (Hedley, 1922); Turricula granobalteatus [sic] (misspelling)

= Turricula granobalteus =

Species of gastropod

Turricula granobalteus is a species of sea snail, a marine gastropod mollusk in the family Clavatulidae.

== Description ==
The size of an adult shell varies between 25 mm and 40 mm.

The elongate-fusiform, turreted shell is rather thin. It contains ten whorls. The sutures are channeled. The colour of the shell is pale buff, with rust dots between the peripheral nodules, and irregular rust streaks and splashes elsewhere.

Sculpture: On the summit of each whorl is a collar of two strong spirals. Besides, the whole surface is over-ran with fine, close, flat-topped spiral threads, amounting to about fifty-five on the body whorl. Along the shoulder runs a row of upright tubercles, twice as high as broad, and more than their own breadth apart—twenty-two on the penultimate whorl, most distinct on the earlier whorls, and gradually fading till they almost disappear on the body whorl. From these evanescent tubercles faint radials descend to the base. The trough of the deeply excavate fasciole is crossed by fine crescentic radial threads.

Aperture :—The outer ip is thin, its edge not reflected, without internal lyrae. The sinus is wide and shallow. The siphonal canal is straight and produced.

== Distribution ==
This marine species occurs off Australia (Northern Territory, Queensland, Western Australia) and off Japan
