= Turricula ceylonica =

Scientific classification
- Kingdom: Animalia
- Phylum: Mollusca
- Class: Gastropoda
- Subclass: Caenogastropoda
- Order: Neogastropoda
- Superfamily: Conoidea
- Family: Clavatulidae
- Genus: Turricula
- Species: T. ceylonica

Binomial name
- Turricula ceylonica (E.A. Smith, 1877)

Synonyms
- Pleurotoma ceylonica E.A. Smith, 1877

Species of gastropod

Turricula ceylonica is a species of sea snail, a marine gastropod mollusk in the family Clavatulidae.

== Description ==
The length of the shell attains 9 mm, its diameter 6 1/2 mm.

The fusiform shell is grayish-white with red spots within the suture and elongated flammules on the body whorl. The shell contains 10 1/2 whorls of which 1 1/2 in the vitreous, convex protoconch. The whorls of the teleoconch are slightly concave below the distinct suture. The entire surface of this species consists of spiral contiguous series of granules. The third row from the top of the whorls is smaller than the others and produces a depression in that region. The columella is slightly twisted. The length of the aperture equals almost half the length of the shell. The thin outer lip stands out in the middle. The siphonal canal is moderately long and slightly curved.

== Distribution ==
This species occurs in the Indian Ocean off Sri Lanka and Southern India.
