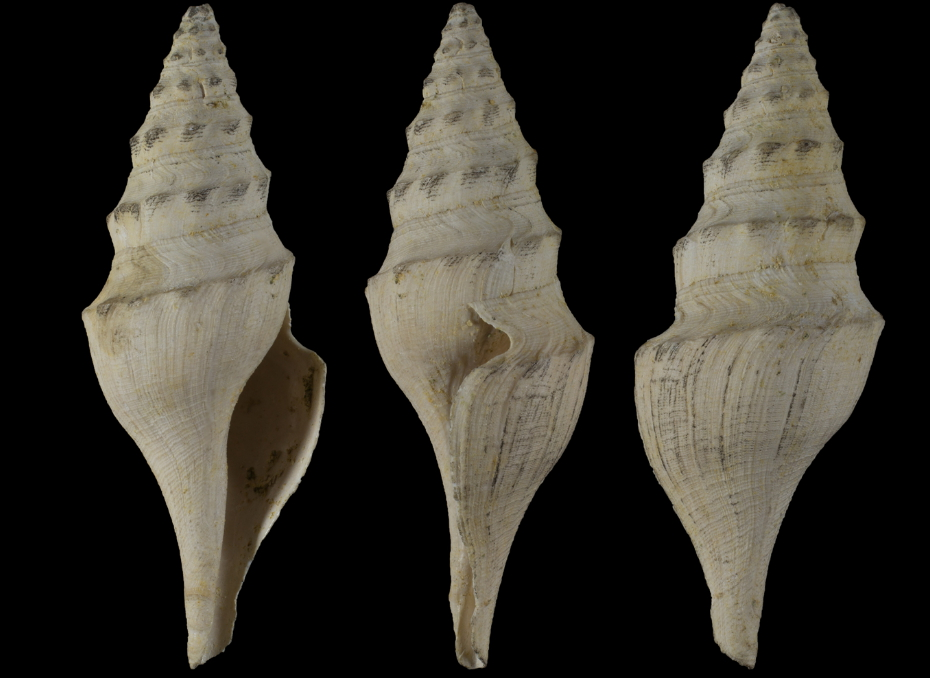
- Shell of † Turricula dentata (specimen at MNHN, Paris)

Scientific classification
- Kingdom: Animalia
- Phylum: Mollusca
- Class: Gastropoda
- Subclass: Caenogastropoda
- Order: Neogastropoda
- Superfamily: Conoidea
- Family: Clavatulidae
- Genus: Turricula
- Species: T. dentata

Binomial name
- Turricula dentata (Lamarck, 1804)

Synonyms
- † Pleurotoma dentata Lamarck, 1804 (original combination); † Surcula dentata (Lamarck, 1804); † Turricula (Crenaturricula) dentata (Lamarck, 1804) superseded combination

= Turricula dentata =

Species of gastropod

Turricula dentata is an extinct species of sea snail, a marine gastropod mollusk in the family Clavatulidae.

== Distribution ==
Fossils of this marine species were found in Eocene strata in Picardie, France
