= Turricula kayalensis =

Scientific classification
- Kingdom: Animalia
- Phylum: Mollusca
- Class: Gastropoda
- Subclass: Caenogastropoda
- Order: Neogastropoda
- Superfamily: Conoidea
- Family: Clavatulidae
- Genus: Turricula
- Species: †T. kayalensis

Binomial name
- †Turricula kayalensis A.Dey, 1962

Synonyms
- † Comitas kayalensis Dey, 1962

Extinct species of gastropod

Turricula kayalensis is an extinct species of sea snail, a marine gastropod mollusc in the family Clavatulidae.

== Distribution ==
This marine species is endemic to India and occurs off Cuddalore
