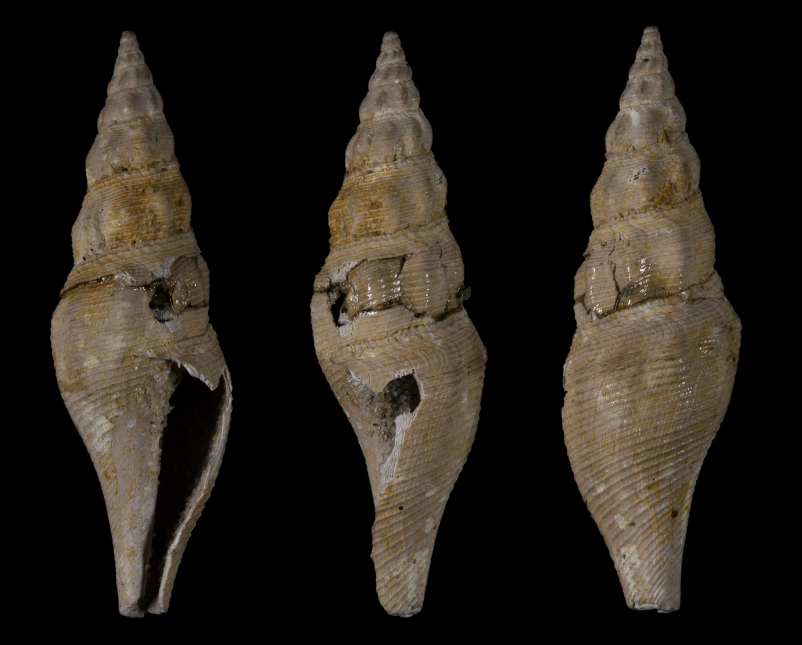
- Shell of † Turricula glyphana (specimen at MNHN, Paris)

Scientific classification
- Kingdom: Animalia
- Phylum: Mollusca
- Class: Gastropoda
- Subclass: Caenogastropoda
- Order: Neogastropoda
- Superfamily: Conoidea
- Family: Clavatulidae
- Genus: Turricula
- Species: †T. glyphana

Binomial name
- †Turricula glyphana (Bayan, 1873)

Synonyms
- † Pleurotoma glyphana Bayan, 1873 unaccepted > superseded combination; † Surcula glyphana (Bayan, 1873); Turricula (Leptosurcula) glyphana (Bayan, 1873) superseded combination

= Turricula glyphana =

Species of gastropod

Turricula glyphana is an extinct species of sea snail, a marine gastropod mollusk in the family Clavatulidae.

== Distribution ==
Fossils of this marine species were found in Eocene strata in Picardy, France
