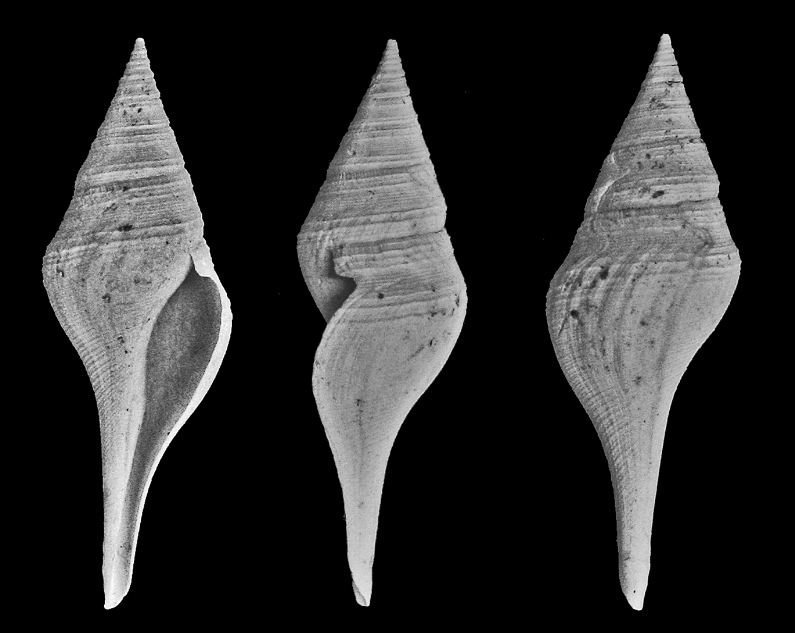
- Shell of † Turricula transversaria (syntype at MNHN, Paris)

Scientific classification
- Kingdom: Animalia
- Phylum: Mollusca
- Class: Gastropoda
- Subclass: Caenogastropoda
- Order: Neogastropoda
- Superfamily: Conoidea
- Family: Clavatulidae
- Genus: Turricula
- Species: T. transversaria

Binomial name
- Turricula transversaria (Lamarck, 1804)

Synonyms
- † Pleurotoma transversaria Lamarck, 1804 superseded combination; Turricula (Surcula) transversaria tenuistriata Brébion, 1992

= Turricula transversaria =

Species of gastropod

Turricula transversaria is an extinct species of sea snail, a marine gastropod mollusk in the family Clavatulidae.

== Distribution ==
Fossils of this marine species were found in Eocene strata in Ile-de-France, France
