= Turricula thurstoni =

Scientific classification
- Kingdom: Animalia
- Phylum: Mollusca
- Class: Gastropoda
- Subclass: Caenogastropoda
- Order: Neogastropoda
- Superfamily: Conoidea
- Family: Clavatulidae
- Genus: Turricula
- Species: T. thurstoni

Binomial name
- Turricula thurstoni (E.A. Smith, 1896)

Synonyms
- Pleurotoma thurstoni E.A. Smith, 1896

Species of gastropod

Turricula thurstoni is a species of sea snail, a marine gastropod mollusk in the family Clavatulidae.

== Description ==
The length of the shell attains 40 mm, its diameter 13 mm.

The white shell has a fusiform shape. It contains 10 whorls.

The shell resembles Turricula javana. The nodules at the periphery are rather similar, but the fine sutural plicae are wanting in P. javana.

== Distribution ==
This marine species occurs off India and Sri Lanka.
