= Turricula wanneri =

Scientific classification
- Kingdom: Animalia
- Phylum: Mollusca
- Class: Gastropoda
- Subclass: Caenogastropoda
- Order: Neogastropoda
- Superfamily: Conoidea
- Family: Clavatulidae
- Genus: Turricula
- Species: T. wanneri

Binomial name
- Turricula wanneri (K. Martin, 1914)

Synonyms
- † Surcula wanneri K. Martin, 1914

Species of gastropod

Turricula wanneri is an extinct species of sea snail, a marine gastropod mollusk in the family Clavatulidae.

== Description ==
The length of the shell attains 14 mm.

== Distribution ==
Fossils of this marine species were found in Eocene strata in Java, Indonesia.
