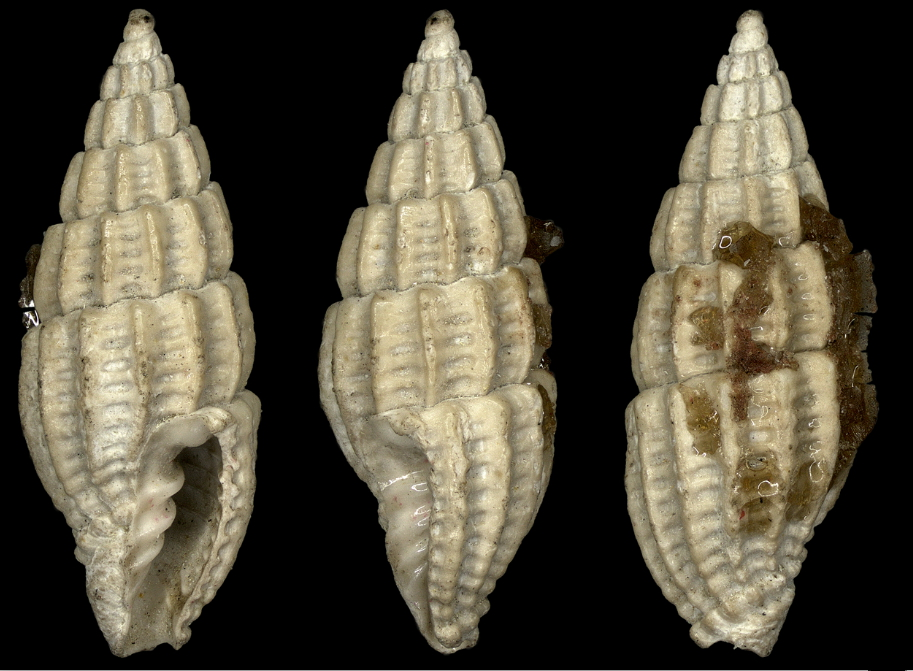
- Shell of † Turricula lirocostata (specimen at MNHN, Paris)

Scientific classification
- Kingdom: Animalia
- Phylum: Mollusca
- Class: Gastropoda
- Subclass: Caenogastropoda
- Order: Neogastropoda
- Superfamily: Conoidea
- Family: Clavatulidae
- Genus: Turricula
- Species: †T. lirocostata

Binomial name
- †Turricula lirocostata Cossmann, 1899

= Turricula lirocostata =

Species of gastropod

Turricula lirocostata is an extinct species of sea snail, a marine gastropod mollusk in the family Clavatulidae.

== Distribution ==
Fossils of this marine species were found in Pliocene strata in Karaikal, India
