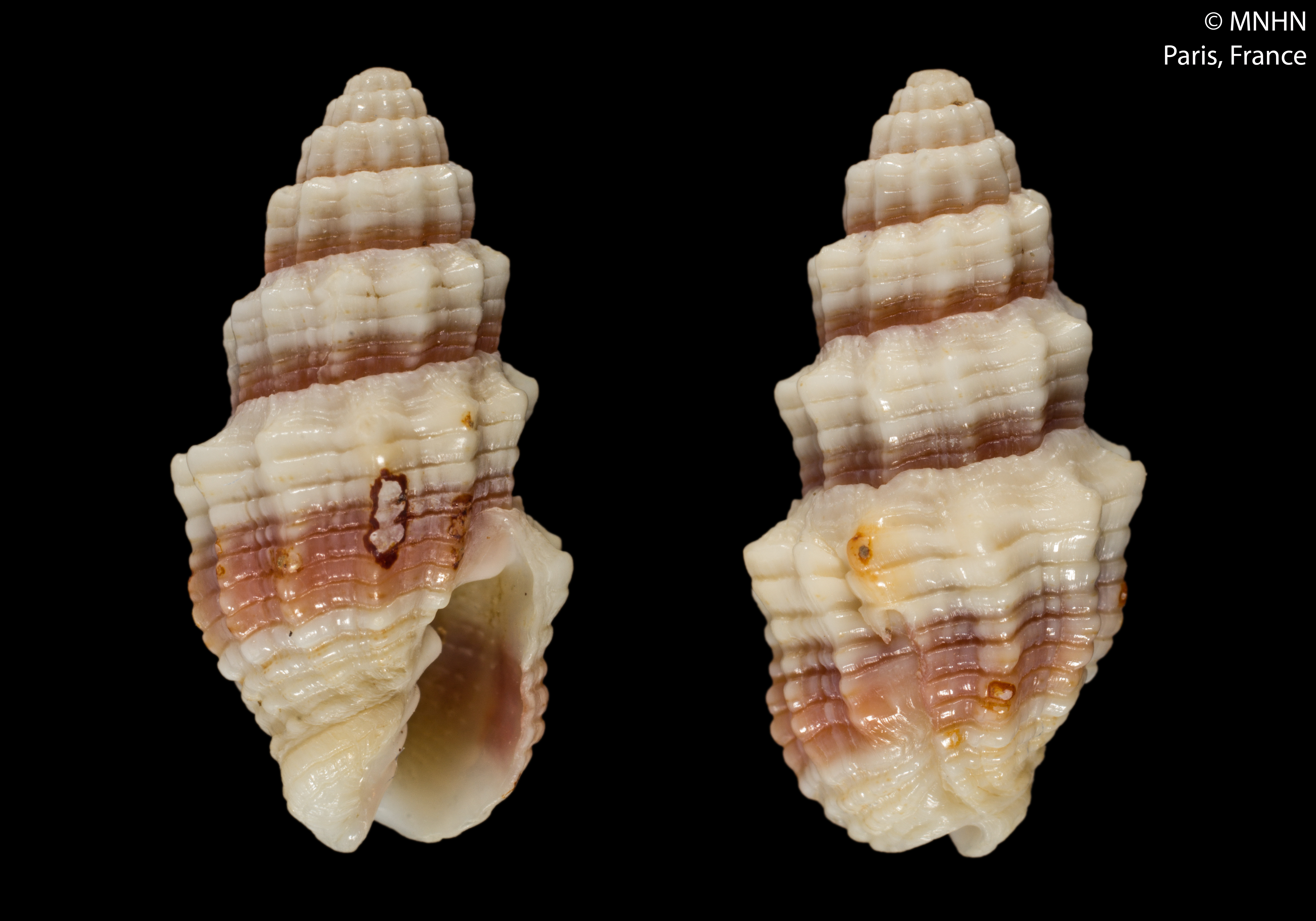
- Shell of Vexillum cadaverosum (specimen at MNHN, Paris)

Scientific classification
- Kingdom: Animalia
- Phylum: Mollusca
- Class: Gastropoda
- Subclass: Caenogastropoda
- Order: Neogastropoda
- Superfamily: Turbinelloidea
- Family: Costellariidae
- Genus: Vexillum
- Species: V. cadaverosum

Binomial name
- Vexillum cadaverosum (Reeve, 1844)

Synonyms
- Mitra (Costellaria) cadaverosa Reeve, 1844; Mitra (Costellaria) cadaverosa var. mutica Dautzenberg & Bouge, 1923 ·; Mitra (Costellaria) cadaverosa var. rubrozonata Dautzenberg & Bouge, 1923; Mitra cadaverosa Reeve, 1844 (original combination); Mitra pharaonis Issel, 1869; Turricula cadaverosa (Reeve, 1844); Vexillum (Costellaria) cadaverosum (Reeve, 1844); Vexillum pharaonis (Issel, 1869)

= Vexillum cadaverosum =

Species of gastropod

Vexillum cadaverosum is a species of small sea snail, marine gastropod mollusk in the family Costellariidae, the ribbed miters.

== Description ==
The length of the shell varies between 13 mm and 22 mm.

The shell is whitish, with a narrow chestnut or chocolate band, either continuous or interrupted by the ribs.

The shell is more stumpy, usually smaller, less disposed to granulation than Vexillum exasperatum (Gmelin, 1791), and its single band, when not continuous, appears in the interstices of the ribs, unlike the interrupted bands of V. exasperatum, which appear on the backs of the ribs.

== Distribution ==
This marine species occurs off the Philippines and Lord Hood Islands; Red Sea; tropical Indo-Pacific to Polynesia, New Caledonia and Hawaii; off Papua New Guinea and Australia (Northern Territory, Queensland, Western Australia).
