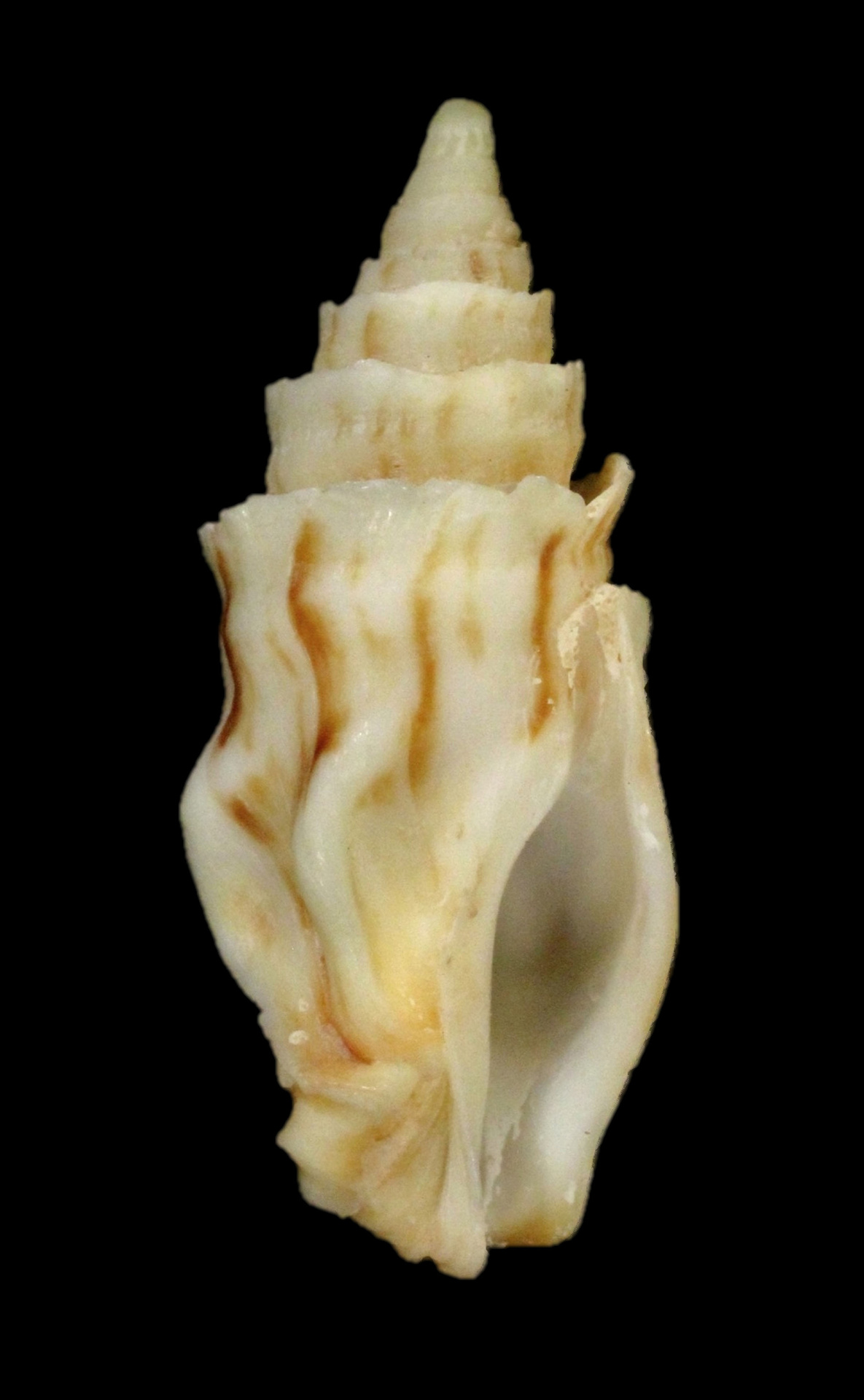
- Caliendrula elstoni

Scientific classification
- Kingdom: Animalia
- Phylum: Mollusca
- Class: Gastropoda
- Subclass: Caenogastropoda
- Order: Neogastropoda
- Superfamily: Conoidea
- Family: Clavatulidae
- Genus: Caliendrula; Kilburn, 1985
- Species: C. elstoni

Binomial name
- Caliendrula elstoni (Barnard, 1962)

Synonyms
- Toxiclionella (Caliendrula) Kilburn, 1985 superseded rank

= Caliendrula =

Genus of gastropods

Caliendrula is a genus of sea snail (marine gastropod mollusks) in the family Clavatulidae. It is monotypic, containing the species Caliendrula elstoni, which was formerly known as Latiaxis elstoni.

== Description ==
The length of the shell attains 35 mm.

== Distribution ==
This marine species occurs off Transkei & KwaZulu-Natal, South Africa.
