= Trachydrillia =

Scientific classification
- Kingdom: Animalia
- Phylum: Mollusca
- Class: Gastropoda
- Subclass: Caenogastropoda
- Order: Neogastropoda
- Superfamily: Conoidea
- Family: Clavatulidae
- Genus: Trachydrillia; Nolf & Swinnen, 2010

Type species
- Trachydrillia denizi Nolf & Swinnen, 2010

Genus of gastropods

Trachydrillia is a genus of sea snail marine gastropod mollusks in the family Clavatulidae.

== Species ==
- Trachydrillia denizi (Nolf & Swinnen, 2010)
