= Hemisurcula =

Scientific classification
- Kingdom: Animalia
- Phylum: Mollusca
- Class: Gastropoda
- Subclass: Caenogastropoda
- Order: Neogastropoda
- Superfamily: Conoidea
- Family: Clavatulidae
- Genus: †Hemisurcula; Casey, 1904

Extinct genus of gastropods

Hemisurcula is an extinct genus of sea snails, marine gastropod mollusks in the family Clavatulidae.

== Description ==
(Original description) In this genus the shell is fusiform, with the protoconch conoidal, multispiral and closely coiled. The nepionic (= relating to the stage of development succeeding the embryonic) spire whorls alone are costate and have also an elevated collar below the suture. The more recent whorls become devoid of lyrae or costae, though having throughout densely close-set and subequal microscopic striae, except the body whorl abruptly below the posterior end of the aperture, which is obliquely and rather coarsely lyrate. The siphonal canal is moderate, straight, and, together with the aperture, forms about half the length of the shell. The sinus is broadly rounded and median in position on the spire whorls. The columella is simple.

The type of this genus is PIeurotoma silicata, of Aldrich, a very remarkable and isolated species occurring in the Lignitic Eocene of the Gregg's Landing beds of Alabama. The beaded subsutural collar, subjacent depression and swollen and finely ribbed lower parts of the two whorls immediately below the protoconch are lost completely on the larger whorls, though the subsutural collar can be feebly traced as a slightly tumid line gradually descending further below the suture with the growth of the shell. Besides silicata, the genus will include the much stouter PIeurotoma roscoei Harris, from the same horizon.

== Species ==
- † Hemisurcula oborni (Marwick, 1960)
- † Hemisurcula perexilis Aldrich 1886
- † Hemisurcula terus Garvie, 2013
