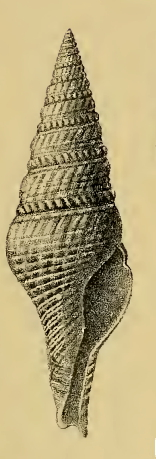
- Original drawing of a shell of Turricula navarchus

Scientific classification
- Kingdom: Animalia
- Phylum: Mollusca
- Class: Gastropoda
- Subclass: Caenogastropoda
- Order: Neogastropoda
- Superfamily: Conoidea
- Family: Clavatulidae
- Genus: Turricula
- Species: T. navarchus

Binomial name
- Turricula navarchus (Melvill & Standen, 1903)

Synonyms
- Pleurotoma(Gemmula) navarchus Melvill & Standen, 1903

= Turricula navarchus =

Species of gastropod

Turricula navarchus is a species of sea snail, a marine gastropod mollusk in the family Clavatulidae.

== Description ==
The length of the shell attains 64 mm, its diameter 18 mm.

The solid, fusiform shell contains 13 whorls of which two are in the protoconch. The shell is remarkable for its regular beaded spiral zone just below the sutures of each whorl, above which are two spiral clearly-cut grooves, the middle of the upper whorls being most beautifully obliquely costulate. The costae are terminated above by a double sulcus surrounding a narrow spiral lira. The body whorl, equalling the others in size, is almost entirely grooved and spirally lirate. The liree below are rufous-spotted. The outer lip is thin, perhaps not quite fully developed. The sinus is well marked but not deep. The columella is somewhat straight. The siphonal canal is broad and rather prolonged.

== Distribution ==
This marine species occurs in the Persian Gulf and the Gulf of Oman.
