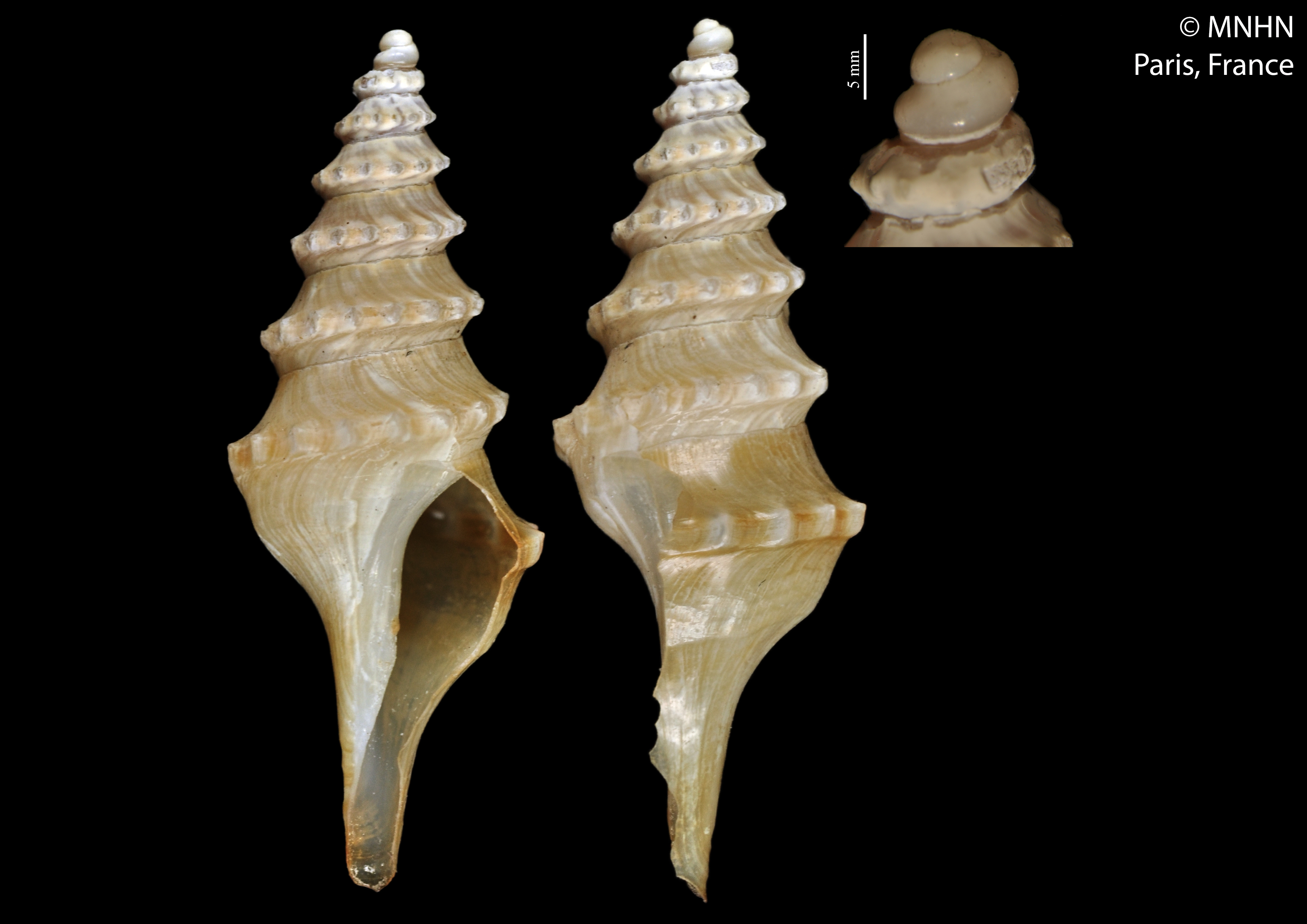
- Shell of Pagodaturris philippinensis (holotype at MNHN, Paris)

Scientific classification
- Kingdom: Animalia
- Phylum: Mollusca
- Class: Gastropoda
- Subclass: Caenogastropoda
- Order: Neogastropoda
- Superfamily: Conoidea
- Family: Clavatulidae
- Genus: Pagodaturris; Kantor, Fedosov & Puillandre, 2018

Type species
- † Pleurotoma molengraaffi Tesch, 1915

= Pagodaturris =

Genus of gastropods

Pagodaturris is a genus of sea snails, marine gastropod mollusks in the family Clavatulidae.

== Species ==
- Pagodaturris molengraaffi (Tesch, 1915)
- Pagodaturris philippinensis Kantor, Fedosov & Puillandre, 2018
- Pagodaturris regilla (Iredale, 1936)
