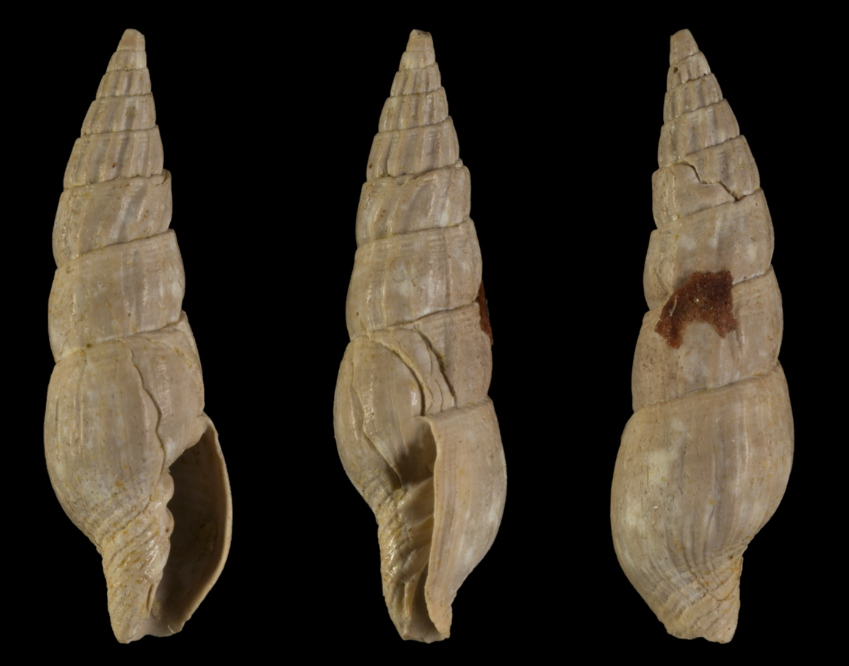
- Shell of Vexillum extraneum (specimen at MNHN, Paris)

Scientific classification
- Kingdom: Animalia
- Phylum: Mollusca
- Class: Gastropoda
- Subclass: Caenogastropoda
- Order: Neogastropoda
- Superfamily: Turbinelloidea
- Family: Costellariidae
- Genus: Vexillum
- Species: †V. extraneum

Binomial name
- †Vexillum extraneum (Deshayes, 1865)

Synonyms
- † Mitra extraneum Deshayes, 1865 superseded combination; † Turricula (Fusimitra) extranea (Deshayes, 1865); † Vexillum (Uromitra) extraneum (Deshayes, 1865)

= Vexillum extraneum =

Species of gastropod

Vexillum extraneum is an extinct species of sea snail, a marine gastropod mollusk, in the family Costellariidae, the ribbed miters.

== Distribution ==
Fossils of this marine species were found in Eocene strata in Picardy, France.
