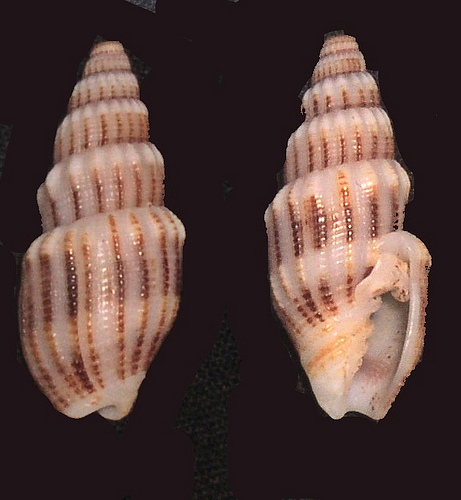
- Vexillum (Costellaria) exasperatum

Scientific classification
- Kingdom: Animalia
- Phylum: Mollusca
- Class: Gastropoda
- Subclass: Caenogastropoda
- Order: Neogastropoda
- Family: Costellariidae
- Genus: Vexillum
- Species: V. exasperatum

Binomial name
- Vexillum exasperatum (Gmelin, 1791)

Synonyms
- Arenimitra michaelis Iredale, T. 1929; Mitra (Costellaria) exasperata (Gmelin, 1791) superseded combination; Mitra (Costellaria) exasperata var. hadfieldi Melvill & Standen, 1895; Mitra arenosa Lamarck, 1811; Mitra corrugata Wood, S.V., 1828; Mitra exasperata (Gmelin, 1791); Mitra exasperata var. hadfieldi Melvill & Standen, 1895; Mitra torulosa Lamarck, J.B.P.A. de, 1811; Mitra tunicula Deshayes, G.P. in Cuvier, G.L.C.F.D., 1838; Mitra transenna Melvill, J.C., 1888 (taxon inquirendum); Vexillum (Costellaria) candida Dautzenberg, Ph. & J.L. Bouge, 1923; Turricula exasperata Gmelin; Vexillum (Costellaria) angelettii Ferrario, 1995; Vexillum (Costellaria) exasperatum (Gmelin, 1791) ·; Vexillum (Costellaria) exusta Dautzenberg, Ph. & J.L. Bouge, 1923; Vexillum (Costellaria) hadfieldi Melvill, J.C. & R. Standen, 1895; Vexillum (Costellaria) michaelis Iredale, T., 1929; Voluta exasperata Gmelin, 1791

= Vexillum exasperatum =

Species of gastropod

Vexillum exasperatum, common name: the roughened mitre, is a species of small sea snail, marine gastropod mollusk in the family Costellariidae, the ribbed miters.

This species is sometimes spelled as Vexillum exasperata.

== Description ==
The shell size varies between 10 mm and 29 mm.

(Described as Mitra (Costellaria) exasperata var. hadfieldi) The shell is turreted with a high spire. It contains seven whorls. The shell is eight or nine ribbed, differing from the type in being dark-brown, banded at the line of the sutures of the upper whorls, and also twice transversely banded at the body whorl. The outer lip shows nodulose striae. The columella has four plaits. Occasionally specimens occur wholly suffused with dark-brown.

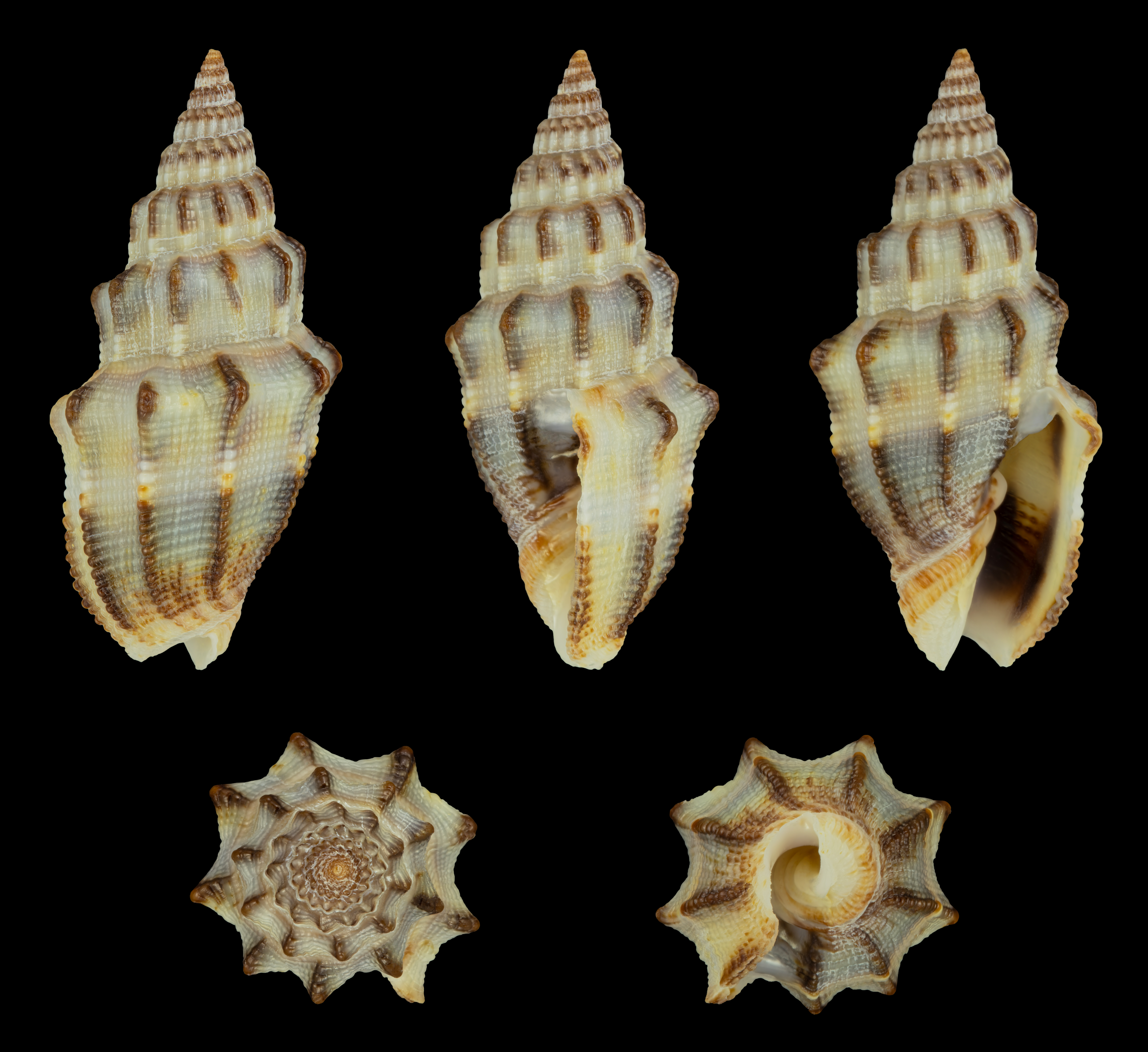

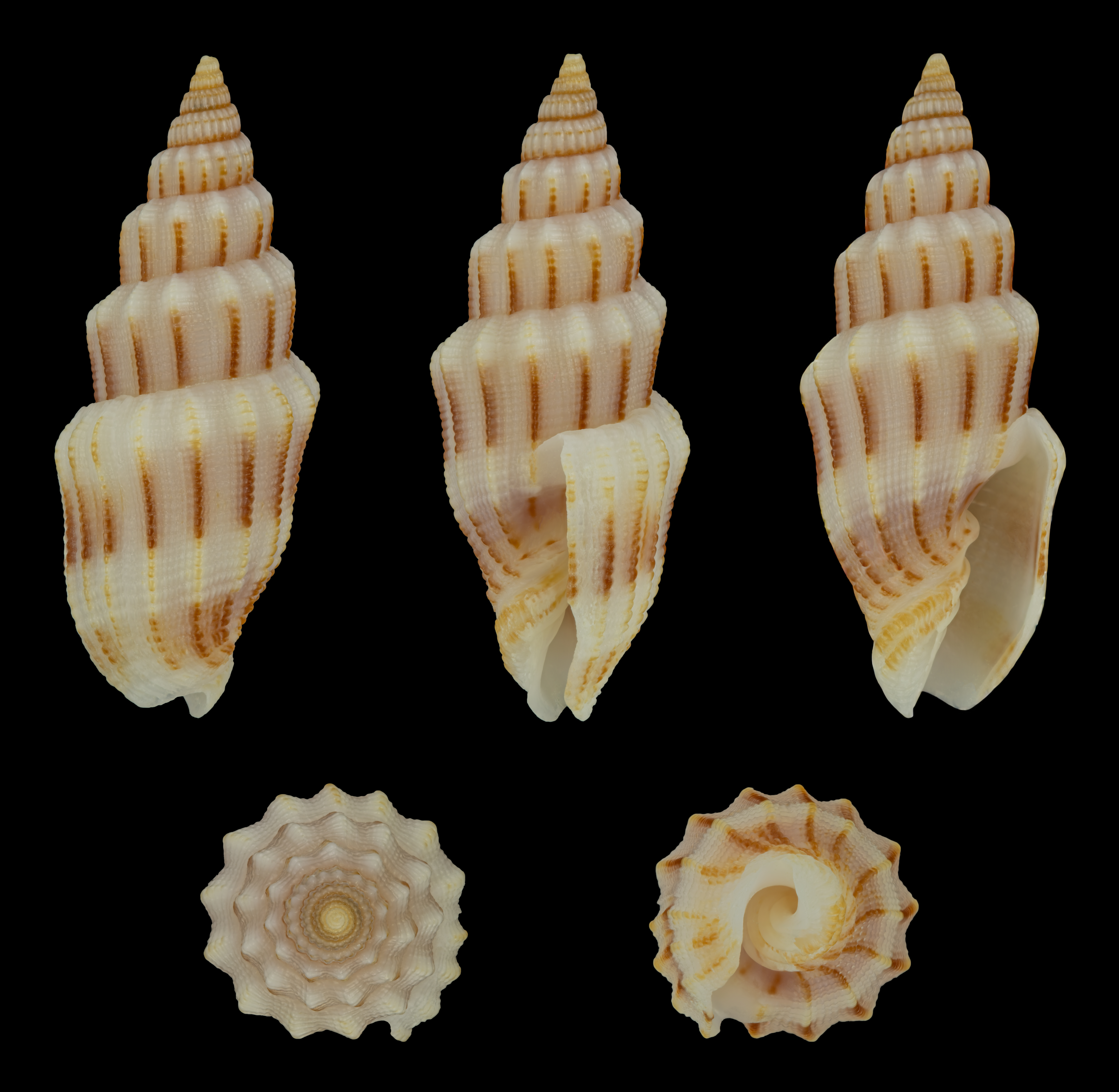

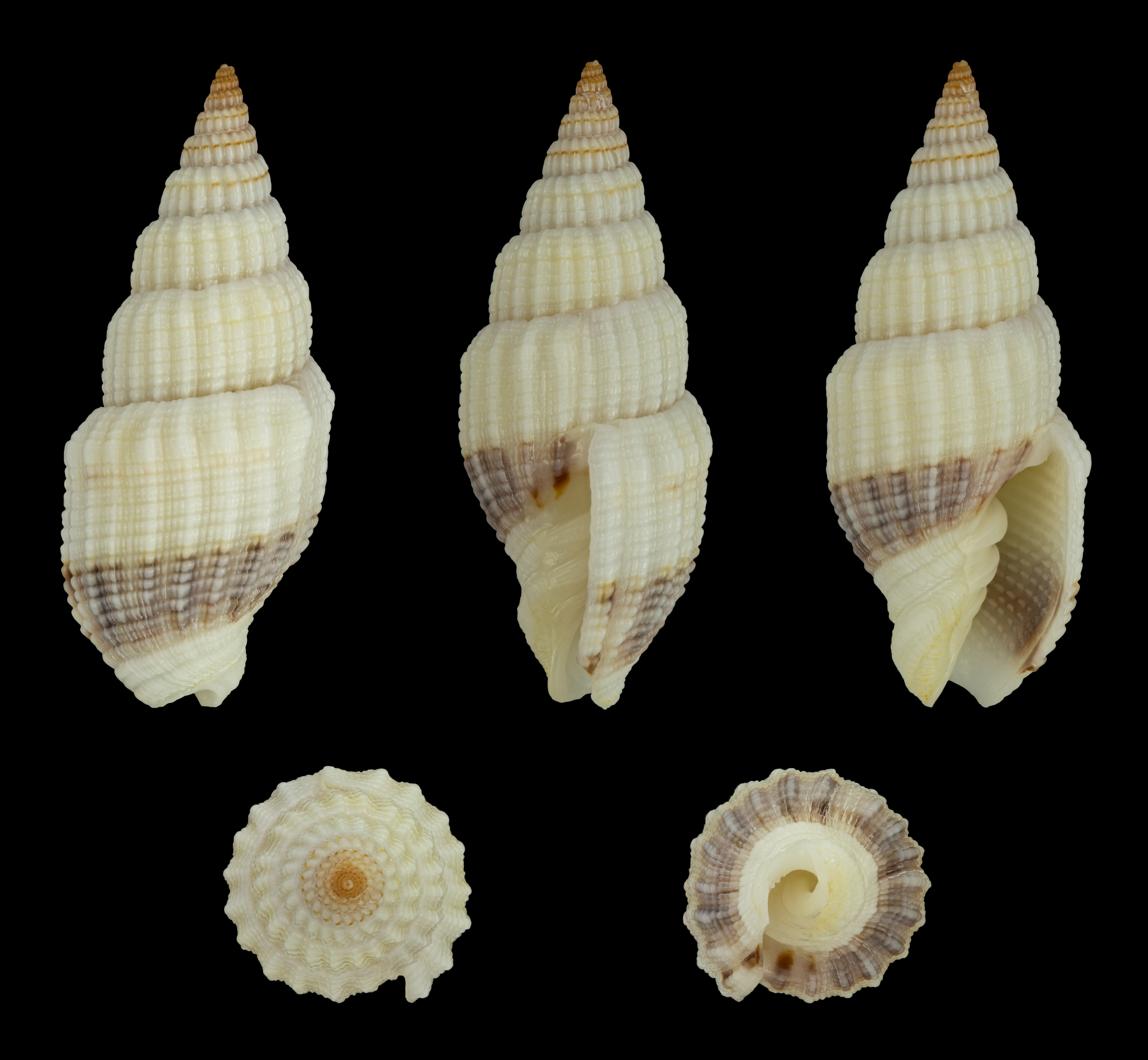

== Distribution ==
This species occurs in the Red Sea, in the Indian Ocean off Chagos Atoll, Madagascar, the Mascarene Basin and Tanzania, and in the Pacific Ocean off the Philippines, Fiji, New Caledonia and the Solomons Islands; also off Australia (Northern Territory, Queensland).
