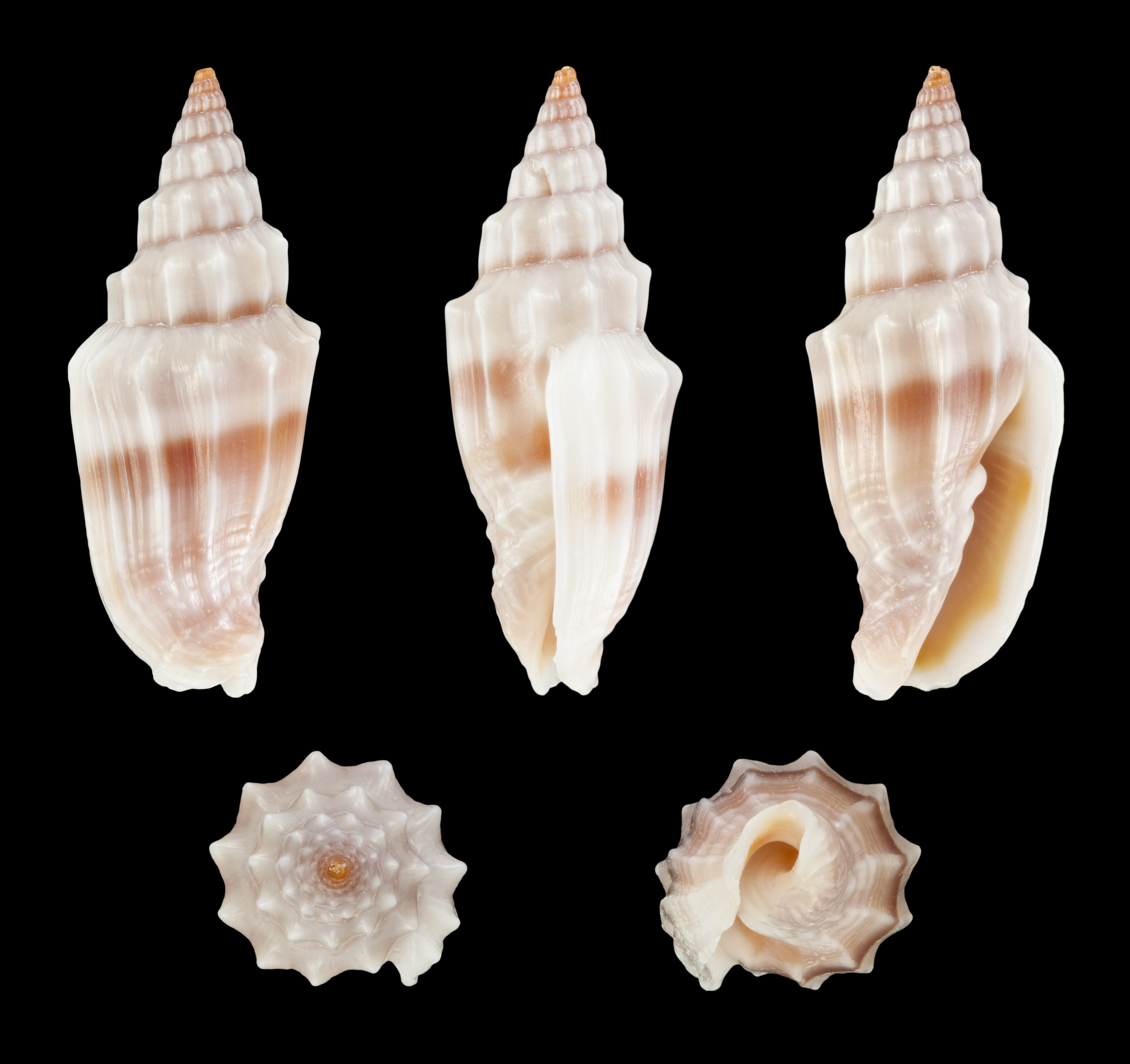

Scientific classification
- Kingdom: Animalia
- Phylum: Mollusca
- Class: Gastropoda
- Subclass: Caenogastropoda
- Order: Neogastropoda
- Family: Costellariidae
- Genus: Vexillum
- Species: V. gruneri

Binomial name
- Vexillum gruneri (Reeve, 1844)

Synonyms
- Mitra gruneri Reeve, 1844 (original combination); Turricula modesta Pease, 1868; Vexillum (Vexillum) gruneri (Reeve, 1844)

= Vexillum gruneri =

Species of gastropod

Vexillum gruneri is a species of small sea snail, marine gastropod mollusk in the family Costellariidae, the ribbed miters.

== Description ==
The length of the shell varies between 13 mm and 27 mm.

(Original description) The shell is shortly fusiform, somewhat harpshaped. The spire is short, turreted and acute. It is longitudinally sharply ribbed, with the ribs sharp pointedly tuberculated above. The upper part of the whorls is flatly angulated. The shell is olive-green, painted in the interstices between the ribs with three rather distant transverse reddish-brown lines. The columella is five-plaited.

The shell is white, more or less distinctly banded with ash, with a superior, and sometimes one or two inferior narrow chestnut revolving lines. The shell is smooth between the longitudinal ribs.

== Distribution ==
This species occurs in the central Indo-West Pacific; also off Papua New Guinea, New Caledonia and Australia (Queensland).

== Bibliography ==
- Turner H. (2001) Katalog der Familie Costellariidae Macdonald 1860 (Gastropoda: Prosobranchia: Muricoidea). Hackenheim: Conchbooks. 100 pp.
