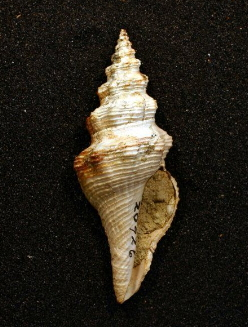
- Shell of Fusiturricula lavinoides (holotype at the Paleontological Research Institution)

Scientific classification
- Kingdom: Animalia
- Phylum: Mollusca
- Class: Gastropoda
- Subclass: Caenogastropoda
- Order: Neogastropoda
- Superfamily: Conoidea
- Family: Drilliidae
- Genus: Fusiturricula
- Species: F. lavinoides

Binomial name
- Fusiturricula lavinoides (Olsson A., 1922)

Synonyms
- Fusiturricula lavinoides limonensis (Olsson, 1922); Turricula lavinoides Olsson, 1922 (original combination); † Turricula lavinoides var. limonensis Olsson, 1922 junior subjective synonym; Turricula limonensis Olsson, 1922

= Fusiturricula lavinoides =

Species of gastropod

Fusiturricula lavinoides is a species of sea snail, a marine gastropod mollusk in the family Drilliidae.

== Description ==
The size of an adult shell attains 54 mm, its diameter 20 mm.

(Original description) The shell is rather large and moderately solid, consisting of about twelve whorls that are heavily sculptured with ribs and spiral cords. The protoconch is composed of two smooth, slightly bulbous whorls, while the post-nuclear whorls increase uniformly in size; these are concave above and widest below the periphery. The suture is strongly appressed and is preceded by a spiral cord.

The anal fasciole is flat or concave, appearing nearly smooth except for approximately three small, widely spaced spirals. The remainder of the whorls are strongly sculptured with eight to twelve axial ribs, which are absent from both the anal fasciole and the base of the last whorl. The spiral sculpture consists of three or four strong cords on the spire-whorls, increasing to ten or more on the body whorl, in addition to those located on the anterior canal. Finer, intercalated threads are present between the main spiral cords on the later whorls, and the intervals between the spirals are finely and longitudinally striated by long growth lines.

The siphonal canal is long and nearly straight, becoming slightly calloused along the inner lip. The outer lip is thin and features a shallow anal sinus situated within the sutural fasciole.

== Distribution ==
This species occurs in the demersal zone of Brazil.

Fossils were found in Miocene strata in Panama.
