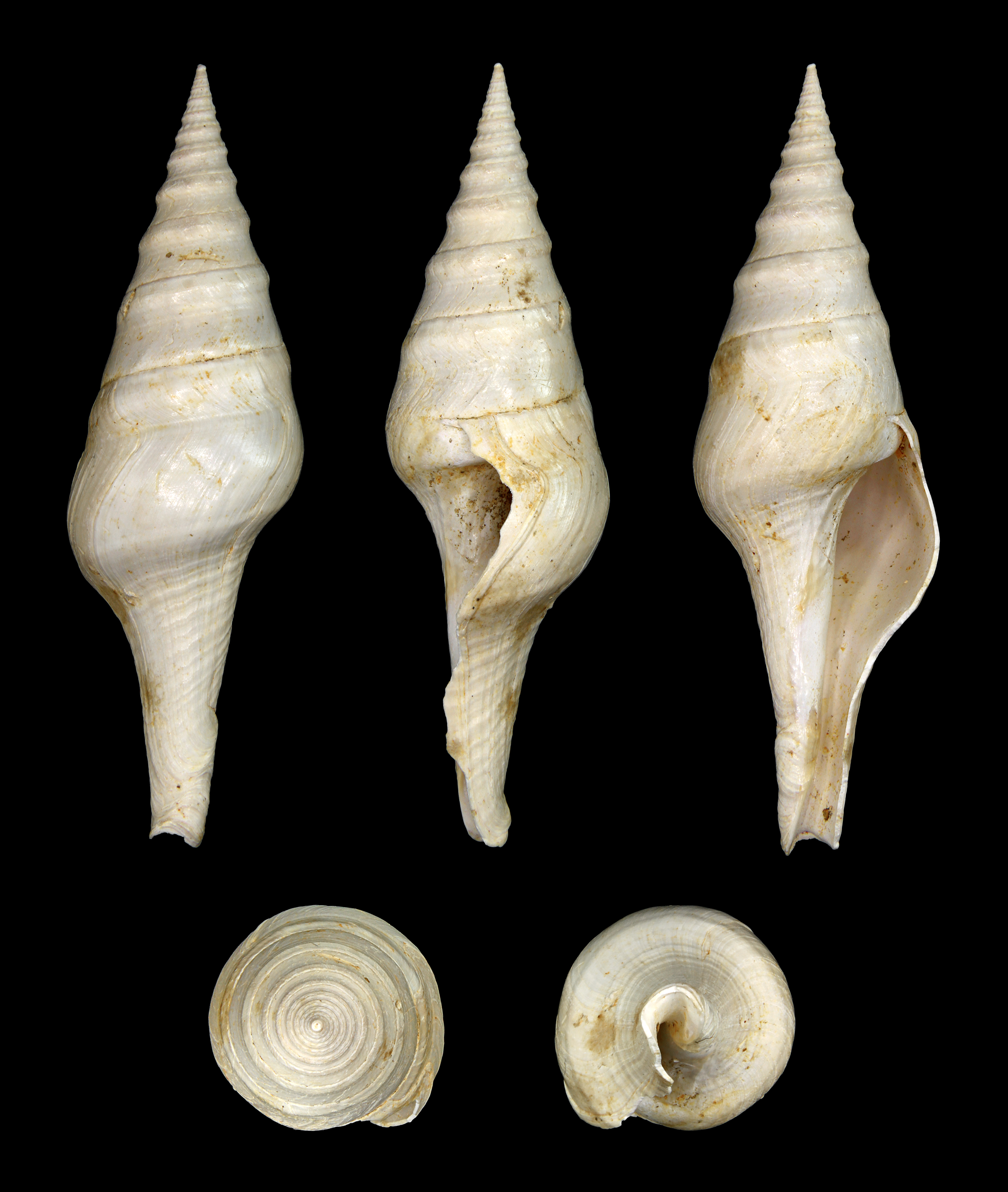
- Five views of a shell of † Tomellana semimarginata

Scientific classification
- Kingdom: Animalia
- Phylum: Mollusca
- Class: Gastropoda
- Subclass: Caenogastropoda
- Order: Neogastropoda
- Superfamily: Conoidea
- Family: Clavatulidae; Gray, 1853

Genera
- See text

Synonyms
- Pusionellinae Gray, 1853; Clionellidae Stimpson, 1865; Melatomidae Gill, 1871; Turriculinae Powell, 1942 (inv.)

= Clavatulidae =

Family of gastropods

Clavatulidae is a taxonomic family of sea snails, marine gastropod mollusks in the superfamily Conoidea. The family is not well differentiated morphologically.

Clavatulidae was raised, based on cladistic analysis, from subfamily to the family level by Rosenberg in 1998. It is no longer regarded as a subfamily of Turridae by several malacologists (Kantor, Sysoev). This family has no subfamilies.

== General characteristics ==
This family consists of species with a medium-sized to rather large, fusiform shell. The oblong, pointed spire is rather high. The aperture is oval and mostly white. The operculum has a medio-lateral nucleus. The siphonal canal varies between rather short (e.g. Pusionella compacta) to moderately long and slightly incurved (e.g. Fusiturris undatiruga). The anal sinus varies from very shallow to rather deep. The outer lip can be slightly incurved and serrated on its side. The subsutural ramp is usually well developed. The sculpture of the shell in this family shows various forms, going from a rather smooth surface (e.g. Gemmuloborsonia colorata) to being finely ribbed longitudinally and striated transversally. The stenoglossan radula has the formula 1-(1-R-1)-1

== Genera ==
Genera in the family Clavatulidae include:

- Benthoclionella Kilburn, 1974
- Caliendrula Kilburn, 1985
- Clavatula Lamarck, 1801
- Clionella Gray, 1847
- † Granulatocincta Harzhauser, Landau & R. Janssen, 2022
- † Hemisurcula Casey, 1904
- Makiyamaia Kuroda, 1961
- † Megaclavatula Harzhauser, Landau & R. Janssen, 2022
- † Neoperrona Harzhauser, Landau & R. Janssen, 2022
- † Orthosurcula T. L. Casey, 1904
- Pagodaturris Kantor, Fedosov & Puillandre, 2018
- Paraclavatula Kantor, Horro, Rolán & Puillandre, 2018
- Perrona Schumacher, 1817
- Pusionella Gray, 1847
- Scaevatula Gofas, 1990
- † Striopusionella Harzhauser, Landau & R. Janssen, 2022
- Tomellana Wenz, 1943
- Toxiclionella Powell, 1966
- † Trachelochetus Cossmann, 1889
- Trachydrillia Nolf & Swinnen, 2010
- Turricula Schumacher, 1817

Genera moved to other families

- Danilacarina Bozzetti, 1997, moved to Cochlespiridae
- Iwaoa Kuroda, 1953, moved to Horaiclavidae

Genera brought into synonymy

- Melatoma Swainson, 1840: synonym of Clionella Gray, 1847
- Netrum Philippi, 1850: synonym of Pusionella Gray, 1847
- Surcula H. Adams & A. Adams, 1853: synonym of Turricula Schumacher, 1817
- Tomella Swainson, 1840: synonym of Tomellana Wenz, 1943
- †Trachelochetus Cossmann, 1889: synonym of †Clavatula (Trachelochetus) Cossmann, 1889 represented as Clavatula Lamarck, 1801
- Tyrrhenoturris Coen, 1929: synonym of Fusiturris Thiele, 1929

== Ecology ==
Species from family Clavatulidae are omnivores, predators and scavengers.
