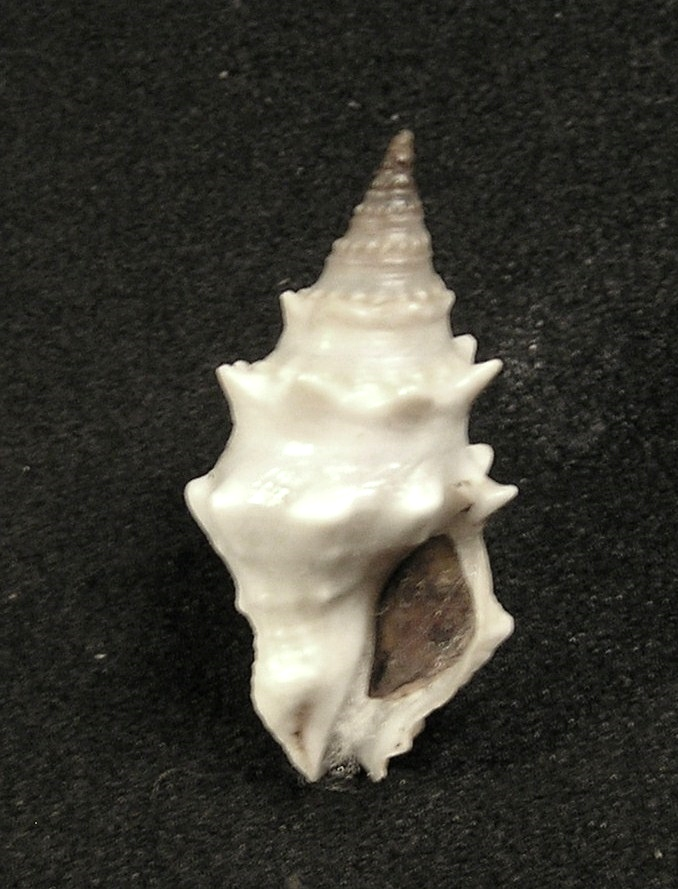
- Apertural view of a shell of Clavatula muricata

Scientific classification
- Kingdom: Animalia
- Phylum: Mollusca
- Class: Gastropoda
- Subclass: Caenogastropoda
- Order: Neogastropoda
- Superfamily: Conoidea
- Family: Clavatulidae
- Genus: Clavatula; Lamarck, 1801

Type species
- Clavatula coronata Lamarck, 1801

Synonyms
- Clavatula (Clavatula) Lamarck, 1801 ·; Pleurotoma (Clavatula) Lamarck, 1801

= Clavatula =

Genus of gastropods

Clavatula is a genus of sea snails, marine gastropod mollusks in the family Clavatulidae.

== Description ==
In this genus, the shell is fusiform, with a well-produced spire. The whorls are coronated with tubercles or short spines at the suture;. The aperture is oval. The columellar lip is smooth, arcuate, and callous behind. The outer lip is thin and arcuated, with the anal sinus situated below the sutural coronal. The operculum is semioval with its nucleus about the middle, on the inner side.

The foot is large, short and obtuse behind. The eyes are placed externally near the extremity of the tentacles. The radula contains a small unicuspid central tooth with single sharp laterals (formula :1-1-1).

The species mostly inhabits the west coast of Africa.

== Species ==
Species within the genus Clavatula include:

- † Clavatula agassizi (Bellardi, 1847)
- † Clavatula agatensis Bellardi, 1877
- Clavatula ahuiri Cossignani & Ardovini, 2014
- Clavatula albasulcata R. Aiken, 2021
- † Clavatula albucianensis Bellardi, 1877
- † Clavatula anaglypta (Millet, 1865)
- † Clavatula apenninica Bellardi, 1877
- † Clavatula apolloniae (R. Hoernes & Auinger, 1891)
- †Clavatula aralica (Luković, 1924) (an extinct species from the Eocene in western Kazakhstan (Tshegan Formation) )
- † Clavatula ariejansseni Harzhauser, Landau & R. Janssen, 2022
- Clavatula asamusiensis Nomura & Zinbo, 1940
- †Clavatula asperulata (Lamarck, 1822)
- † Clavatula atatuerki Harzhauser, Landau & R. Janssen, 2022
- † Clavatula auingeri Finlay, 1927
- † Clavatula barnabasi Kovács, Leél-Őssy & Vicián, 2023
- † Clavatula basilica Bellardi, 1877
- † Clavatula beauforti Oostingh, 1938
- † Clavatula berauensis Beets, 1941
- † Clavatula bicarinata Bellardi, 1877
- Clavatula bimarginata (Lamarck, 1822)
- † Clavatula boreoromana Kautsky, 1925
- † Clavatula burdigalensis Cossmann, 1895
- Clavatula caerulea (Weinkauff & Kobelt, 1875)
- † Clavatula camillae (R. Hoernes & Auinger, 1891)
- †Clavatula carinifera Grateloup, 1832
- † Clavatula circumclusa Bellardi, 1877
- Clavatula colini Von Maltzan, 1883
- † Clavatula complanata Bellardi, 1877
- †Clavatula concatenata (Grateloup, 1832)
- Clavatula congoensis Nolf & Verstraeten, 2008
- † Clavatula consimilis Bellardi, 1877
- † Clavatula coppii Bellardi, 1877
- Clavatula coronata Lamarck, 1801
- Clavatula cossignanii Ardovini, 2004
- † Clavatula danuvii Vicián, Z. Kovács & Stein, 2019
- Clavatula debilis (R.B. Hinds, 1843) (taxon inquirendum)
- Clavatula decorata Sowerby III, 1916
- † Clavatula defossa Bellardi, 1877
- † Clavatula defrancii Bellardi, 1877
- Clavatula diadema (Kiener, 1840)
- † Clavatula djocdjocartae (K. Martin, 1885)
- † Clavatula dodecapunctata Vera-Peláez & Lozano-Francisco, 2001
- † Clavatula dujardini Peyrot, 1938
- † Clavatula eichwaldi Bellardi, 1877
- † Clavatula excavata Bellardi, 1877
- Clavatula filograna Odhner, 1923
- Clavatula flammulata Knudsen, 1952
- † Clavatula flexicosta Bellardi, 1877
- † Clavatula francisci (Toula, 1901) (accepted > unreplaced junior homonym)
- Clavatula gabonensis Melvill, 1923
- † Clavatula geniculata Bellardi, 1877
- † Clavatula glaberrima J.P.S. Grateloup, 1832
  - †Clavatula glaberrima praecedens (Peyrot, 1931)
- † Clavatula gothica Bellardi, 1877
- Clavatula gracilior Sowerby II, 1870
- † Clavatula gracilis Erünal-Erentöz, 1958
- † Clavatula gradata (Defrance, 1826)
- Clavatula hattenbergeri Nolf & Verstraeten, 2008
- Clavatula helena Bartsch, 1915
- †Clavatula helwerdae Ceulemans, Van Dingenen & Landau, 2018
- † Clavatula heros (Mayer, 1858)
- † Clavatula hirmetzli Z. Kovács & Vicián, 2021
- †Clavatula iberoechinata Vera-Peláez & Lozano-Francisco, 2001
- Clavatula imperialis Lamarck, 1816
- † Clavatula implexa Bellardi, 1877
- † Clavatula inedita Bellardi, 1877
- † Clavatula inornata Bellardi, 1877
- † Clavatula interrupta (Brocchi, 1814) (accepted > unreplaced junior homonym)
- † Clavatula irisae Harzhauser, Landau & R. Janssen, 2022
- † Clavatula isseli Bellardi, 1877
- † Clavatula istvani Kovács, Leél-Őssy & Vicián, 2023
- † Clavatula jarzynkae Harzhauser, Landau & R. Janssen, 2022
- † Clavatula juliae (R. Hoernes & Auinger, 1891)
- † Clavatula justinae (R. Hoernes & Auinger, 1891)
- Clavatula knudseni Nolf & Verstraeten, 2007
- Clavatula kraepelini (Strebel, 1914)
- † Clavatula labiolirata Landau, Harzhauser, İslamoğlu & C. M. Silva, 2013
- † Clavatula laciniata Bellardi, 1877
- † Clavatula landaui Vera-Peláez & Lozano-Francisco, 2001
- Clavatula lelieuri (Récluz, 1851)
- † Clavatula ligeriana (Peyrot, 1938)
- Clavatula malala Bozzetti, 2018
- † Clavatula manzonii Bellardi, 1877
- † Clavatula mariae (R. Hoernes & Auinger, 1891)
- Clavatula martensi Von Maltzan, 1883
- † Clavatula martinelli Vera-Peláez & Lozano-Francisco, 2001
- Clavatula matthiasi Nolf, 2008
- Clavatula milleti (Petit de la Saussaye, 1851)
- Clavatula muricata (Lamarck, 1822)
- Clavatula mystica (Reeve, 1843)
- Clavatula nathaliae Nolf, 2006
- † Clavatula neogradata Glibert, 1954
- † Clavatula nodosa Bellardi, 1877
- † Clavatula obtruta (Millet, 1865)
- † Clavatula olgae (R. Hoernes & Auinger, 1891)
- † Clavatula oostinghi Beets, 1942
- † Clavatula orientoromana Báldi, 1960
- † Clavatula palatina Strausz, 1954
- † Clavatula pettkoi Biskupič, 2023
- Clavatula petzyae Boyer & Ryall, 2006
- † Clavatula pusilla Bellardi, 1877
- † Clavatula pyramidum Cuvillier, 1933
- Clavatula regia (Röding, 1798)
- †Clavatula reginae Hoernes & Auinger, 1891
- Clavatula retusa R.B. Hinds, 1843 (taxon inquirendum)
- † Clavatula romana (Defrance, 1826)
- Clavatula rubrifasciata (Reeve, 1845)
- † Clavatula rugata Bellardi, 1877
- † Clavatula ruida Bellardi, 1877
- † Clavatula rusticula (Mayer-Eymar, 1886)
- Clavatula santhai Z. Kovács & Vicián, 2021 †
- † Clavatula sceauxensis Landau, Van Dingenen & Ceulemans, 2020
- † Clavatula seminuda Bellardi, 1877
- † Clavatula seyithasanensis Landau, Harzhauser, İslamoğlu & C. M. Silva, 2013
- Clavatula smithi Knudsen, 1952
- Clavatula solangeae Bozzetti, 2006
- † Clavatula sophiae (R. Hoernes & Auinger, 1891)
- † Clavatula sorini Harzhauser, Landau & R. Janssen, 2022
- † Clavatula sotterii (Michelotti, 1847)
- Clavatula strebeli Knudsen, 1952
- Clavatula taxea (Röding, 1798)
- † Clavatula theodori (Toula, 1901)
- Clavatula tripartita (Weinkauff & Kobelt, 1876)
- † Clavatula turriculata (Grateloup, 1846)
- † Clavatula turriculoides Bellardi, 1877
- † Clavatula unicostata Bellardi, 1877
- † Clavatula veronicae (R. Hoernes & Auinger, 1891)
- Clavatula virgineus (Dillwyn, 1817)
- † Clavatula vitalisi Strausz, 1955
- Clavatula xanteni Nolf & Verstraeten, 2006

Nomen dubium

- Clavatula erecta W. H. Turton, 1932

Species brought into synonymy

- Clavatula albicans Hinds, 1843: synonym of Splendrillia albicans (Hinds, 1843)
- Clavatula amabilis Hinds, 1843: synonym of Tritonoturris amabilis (Hinds, 1843)
- Clavatula argillacea Hinds, 1843: synonym of Etrema argillacea (Hinds, 1843)
- Clavatula auriculifera Lamarck, J.B.P.A. de M. 1816: synonym of Clavus canalicularis (Röding, 1798)
- Clavatula bella Hinds, 1843: synonym of Bellacythara bella (Hinds, 1843)
- Clavatula boreointerrupta Kautsky, 1925: synonym of † Granulatocincta boreointerrupta (Kautsky, 1925)
- Clavatula candida Hinds, 1843: synonym of Glyphostoma candida (Hinds, 1843)
- Clavatula candida (Philippi, 1848): synonym of Pusionella valida (Dunker, 1852)
- Clavatula christianae Nolf, 2011: synonym of Paraclavatula christianae (Nolf, 2011) (original combination)
- Clavatula coelata Hinds, 1843: synonym of Crassispira coelata (Hinds, 1843)
- Clavatula crenularis Lamarck, 1816: synonym of Ptychobela nodulosa (Gmelin, 1791)
- Clavatula delphinae Nolf, 2008: synonym of Paraclavatula delphinae (Nolf, 2008) (original combination)
- Clavatula echinata Lamarck, 1816: synonym of Clavus flammulatus Montfort, 1810
- Clavatula ericea Hinds, 1843: synonym of Lioglyphostoma ericea (Hinds, 1843)
- Clavatula fimbriata Hinds, 1843: synonym of Daphnellopsis fimbriata (Hinds, 1843)
- Clavatula flammea Hinds, 1843: synonym of Daphnella flammea (Hinds, 1843)
- Clavatula flavidula (Lamarck, 1822): synonym of Clathrodrillia flavidula (Lamarck, 1822)
- Clavatula fulva Hinds, 1843: synonym of Clavus fulva (Hinds, 1843)
- Clavatula gravis (Hinds, 1843): synonym of Makiyamaia gravis (Hinds, 1843)
- Clavatula griffithii Gray, 1834: synonym of Ptychobela griffithii (Gray, 1834)
- Clavatula haliplex Bartsch, 1915: synonym of Toxiclionella haliplex (Bartsch, 1915)
- Clavatula halistrepta Bartsch, 1915: synonym of Clionella halistrepta (Bartsch, 1915)
- Clavatula hottentota (E. A. Smith, 1882): synonym of Clavus hottentotus (E. A. Smith, 1882)
- Clavatula impressa Hinds, 1843: synonym of Kylix impressa (Hinds, 1843)
- Clavatula kraussii (E. A. Smith, 1877): synonym of Clionella kraussii (E. A. Smith, 1877)
- Clavatula laeta Hinds, 1843: synonym of Splendrillia laeta (Hinds, 1843)
- Clavatula lineata Lamarck, 1816: synonym of Perrona lineata (Lamarck, 1816)
- Clavatula lobatopsis Barnard, 1963: synonym of Clionella lobatopsis (Barnard, 1963)
- Clavatula luctuosa (Hinds, 1843): synonym of Crassispira kluthi E. K. Jordan, 1936
- Clavatula marmarina (Watson, 1881): synonym of Fenimorea marmarina (Watson, 1881)
- Clavatula merita Hinds, 1843: synonym of Tenaturris merita (Hinds, 1843)
- Clavatula metula Hinds, 1843: synonym of Anarithma metula (Hinds, 1843)
- Clavatula micans Hinds, 1843: synonym of Globidrillia micans (Hinds, 1843)
- Clavatula neglecta Hinds, 1843: synonym of Glyphostoma neglecta (Hinds, 1843)
- Clavatula nitens Hinds, 1843: synonym of Agladrillia nitens (Hinds, 1843)
- Clavatula obesa Reeve: synonym of Perrona obesa (Reeve, 1842)
- Clavatula occata Hinds, 1843: synonym of Diptychophlia occata (Hinds, 1843)
- Clavatula pardalis Hinds, 1843: synonym of Anachis pardalis (Hinds, 1843)
- Clavatula parilis E. A. Smith, 1902: synonym of Clavatula tripartita (Weinkauff, 1876)
- Clavatula perronii (Reeve, 1843): synonym of Perrona perron (Gmelin, 1791)
- Clavatula pfefferi (Strebel, 1912): synonym of Fusiturris pfefferi (Strebel, 1912)
- Clavatula plumbea Hinds, 1843: synonym of Kurtziella plumbea (Hinds, 1843)
- Clavatula pseudomystica Nolf, 2008: synonym of Paraclavatula pseudomystica (Nolf, 2008) (original combination)
- Clavatula pudica Hinds, 1843: synonym of Agladrillia pudica (Hinds, 1843)
- Clavatula pungens Gould, 1860: synonym of Veprecula pungens (Gould, 1860)
- Clavatula pyramis Hinds, 1843: synonym of Pseudorhaphitoma pyramis (Hinds, 1843)
- Clavatula quinteni Nolf & Verstraeten, 2006: synonym of Perrona quinteni (Nolf & Verstraeten, 2006)
- Clavatula quisqualis Hinds, 1843: synonym of Leptadrillia quisqualis (Hinds, 1843)
- Clavatula rava Hinds, 1843: synonym of Clathurella rava (Hinds, 1843)
- Clavatula rigida Hinds, 1843: synonym of Clathurella rigida (Hinds, 1843)
- Clavatula robusta Hinds, 1843: synonym of Cheungbeia robusta (Hinds, 1843)
- Clavatula rubida Hinds, 1843: synonym of Lienardia rubida (Hinds, 1843)
- Clavatula rubiginosa Hinds, 1843: synonym of Otitoma rubiginosa (Hinds, 1843)
- Clavatula rubrofasciata Reeve: synonym of Clavatula rubrifasciata (Reeve, 1845)
- Clavatula sacerdos (Reeve, 1845): synonym of Clavatula mystica (Reeve, 1843)
- Clavatula scalaris Hinds, 1843: synonym of Tritonoturris scalaris (Hinds, 1843)
- Clavatula sculpta Hinds, 1843: synonym of Rimosodaphnella sculpta (Hinds, 1843)
- Clavatula semicostata (Kiener, 1840): synonym of Clionella semicostata (Kiener, 1840)
- Clavatula sinensis Hinds, 1843: synonym of Crassispira sinensis (Hinds, 1843)
- Clavatula sinuata (Born, 1778): synonym of Clionella sinuata (Born, 1778)
- Clavatula spicata Hinds, 1843: synonym of Inquisitor spicata (Hinds, 1843)
- Clavatula spirata Lamarck: synonym of Perrona spirata (Lamarck, 1816)
- Clavatula spurca Hinds, 1843: synonym of Etrema spurca (Hinds, 1843)
- Clavatula striata Gray, 1826: synonym of Epideira striata (Gray, 1826)
- Clavatula subspirata (von Martens, 1902): synonym of Perrona subspirata (von Martens, 1902)
- Clavatula subventricosa (E. A. Smith, 1877): synonym of Clionella subventricosa (E. A. Smith, 1877)
- Clavatula taxus : synonym of Clavatula taxea (Röding, 1798) (incorrect subsequent spelling)
- Clavatula tessellata Hinds, 1843: synonym of Kermia tessellata (Hinds, 1843)
- Clavatula tumida Sowerby II, 1870: synonym of Toxiclionella tumida (Sowerby II, 1870)
- Clavatula turriplana (G.B. Sowerby III, 1903): synonym of Turricula turriplana (Sowerby III, 1903)
