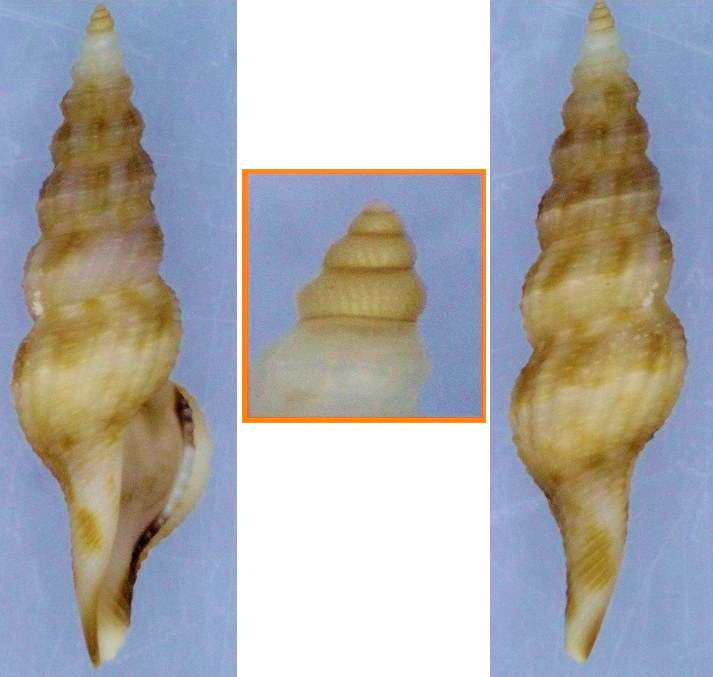
- The shell and the protoconch of Clavatula debilis

Scientific classification
- Kingdom: Animalia
- Phylum: Mollusca
- Class: Gastropoda
- Subclass: Caenogastropoda
- Order: Neogastropoda
- Superfamily: Conoidea
- Family: Clavatulidae
- Genus: Clavatula
- Species: C. debilis

Binomial name
- Clavatula debilis (Hinds, 1843)

Synonyms
- Clathurella debilis Hinds, 1843; Glyphostomoides debilis Hinds, 1843; Pleurotoma debilis Reeve, 1846

= Clavatula debilis =

Species of gastropod

Clavatula debilis is a species of sea snail, a marine gastropod mollusk in the family Clavatulidae.

== Description ==
The elongate, fusiform and acuminate shell grows to a length of 14 mm. It contains eight rounded and ribbed whorls, transversely striate. The small ribs are round. The sutures are simple. The inner lip is crenulate. The siphonal canal is of mediocre length.

== Distribution ==
This marine species occurs off New Guinea; in the Strait of Macassar, Indonesia; off the Philippines, Thailand and off Zanzibar; also off Darnley Island, Torres Straits.
