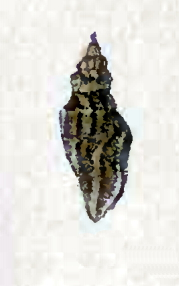
- Image of a shell of Eucithara cinnamomea

Scientific classification
- Domain: Eukaryota
- Kingdom: Animalia
- Phylum: Mollusca
- Class: Gastropoda
- Subclass: Caenogastropoda
- Order: Neogastropoda
- Superfamily: Conoidea
- Family: Mangeliidae
- Genus: Eucithara
- Species: E. cinnamomea

Binomial name
- Eucithara cinnamomea (Hinds, 1843)

Synonyms
- Mangelia cinnamomea Hinds, 1843 (original combination)

= Eucithara cinnamomea =

Species of gastropod

Eucithara cinnamomea is a small sea snail, a marine gastropod mollusk in the family Mangeliidae.

== Distribution ==
This marine species is found off the Strait of Malacca, the Macassar Strait and Northern New Guinea.

== Description ==
The length of the shell attains 13 mm.

The shell is shouldered, plicately ribbed, transversely obsoletely striated. It is cinnamon-colored, narrowly white-banded.
