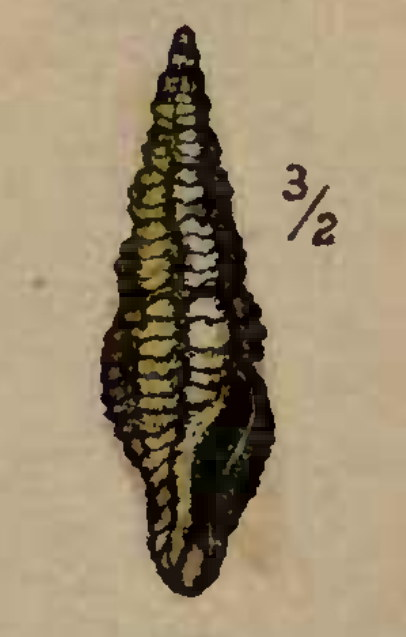
- Drawing of a shell of Diptychophlia occata

Scientific classification
- Kingdom: Animalia
- Phylum: Mollusca
- Class: Gastropoda
- Subclass: Caenogastropoda
- Order: Neogastropoda
- Superfamily: Conoidea
- Family: Borsoniidae
- Genus: Diptychophlia; Berry, 1964

Type species
- Clavatula occata Hinds, 1843

Synonyms
- Diptychoplia [sic] (misspelling)

= Diptychophlia =

Genus of gastropods

Diptychophlia is a genus of sea snails, marine gastropod mollusks in the family Borsoniidae.

== Species ==
Species within the genus Diptychophlia include:

- Diptychophlia hubrechti Cunha, 2005
- Diptychophlia occata (Hinds, 1843)
