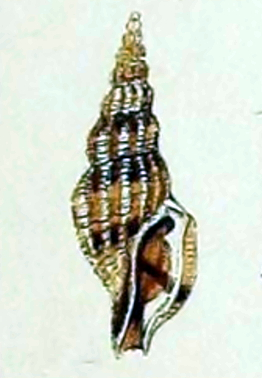
- Bellacythara bella

Scientific classification
- Kingdom: Animalia
- Phylum: Mollusca
- Class: Gastropoda
- Subclass: Caenogastropoda
- Order: Neogastropoda
- Superfamily: Conoidea
- Family: Mangeliidae
- Genus: Bellacythara; McLean, 1971

Type species
- Clavatula bella Hinds, 1843

Species
- See text

= Bellacythara =

Genus of gastropods

Bellacythara is a genus of minute sea snails, marine gastropod mollusks or micromollusks in the family Mangeliidae.

== Species ==
Species within the genus Bellacythara include:

- Bellacythara bella (Hinds, 1843)
