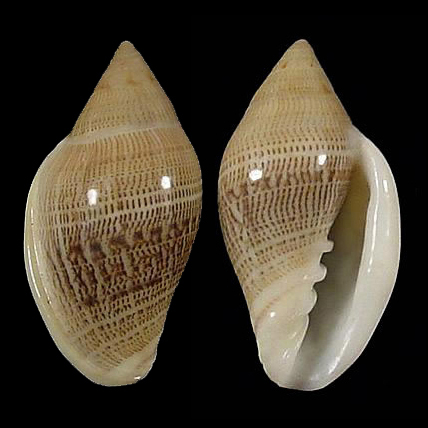
- Apertural (right) and abapertural (left) views of a shell of M. belcheri

Scientific classification
- Kingdom: Animalia
- Phylum: Mollusca
- Class: Gastropoda
- Subclass: Caenogastropoda
- Order: Neogastropoda
- Family: Marginellidae
- Genus: Marginella
- Species: M. belcheri

Binomial name
- Marginella belcheri Hinds, 1844

= Marginella belcheri =

Species of gastropod

Marginella belcheri is a species of sea snail, a marine gastropod mollusc in the family Marginellidae, the margin snails.
