= Mangelia caelata =

Scientific classification
- Kingdom: Animalia
- Phylum: Mollusca
- Class: Gastropoda
- Subclass: Caenogastropoda
- Order: Neogastropoda
- Superfamily: Conoidea
- Family: Mangeliidae
- Genus: Mangelia
- Species: M. caelata

Binomial name
- Mangelia caelata (R.B. Hinds, 1843)

Species of gastropod

Mangelia caelata is a species of sea snail, a marine gastropod mollusk in the family Mangeliidae.

== Description ==
It is a dark-brown shell with an even darker aperture, featuring one spiral line below the suture and oblique axial ribs.

== Distribution ==
This species was found in the Pacific Ocean off Nicaragua, dredged at a depth of 20 fathoms.
