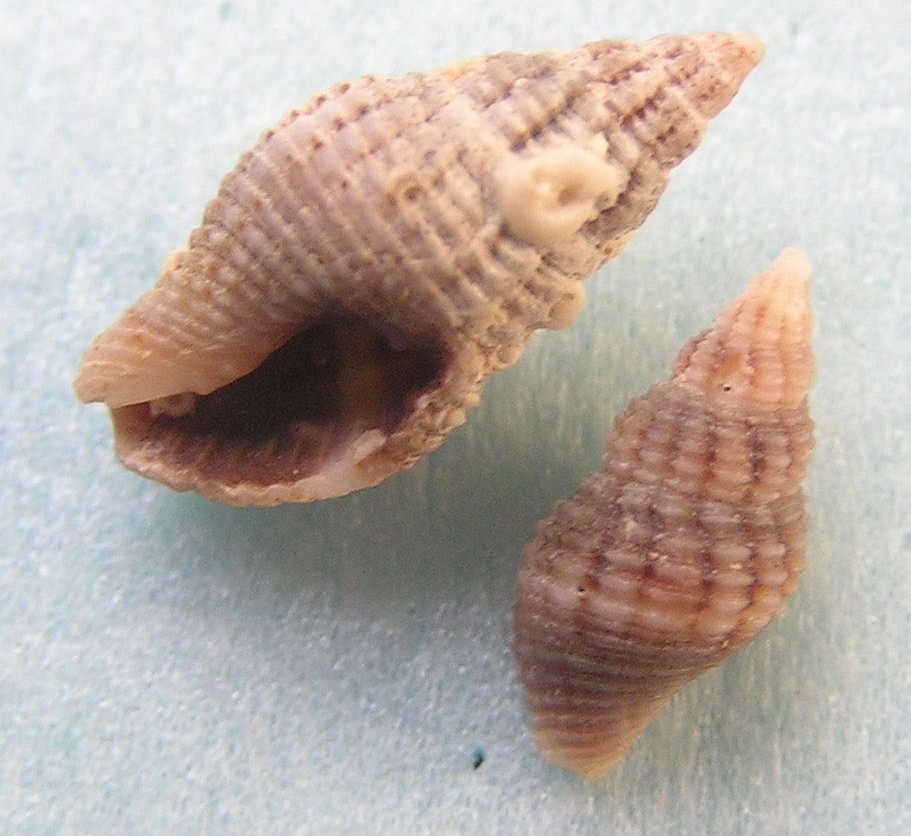

Scientific classification
- Kingdom: Animalia
- Phylum: Mollusca
- Class: Gastropoda
- Subclass: Caenogastropoda
- Order: Neogastropoda
- Superfamily: Conoidea
- Family: Clavatulidae
- Genus: Clavatula
- Species: C. rubrifasciata

Binomial name
- Clavatula rubrifasciata (Reeve, 1845)

Synonyms
- Clavatula rubrofasciata Reeve; Pleurotoma rubrifasciata Reeve, 1845

= Clavatula rubrifasciata =

Species of gastropod

Clavatula rubrifasciata is a species of sea snail, a marine gastropod mollusk in the family Clavatulidae.

== Description ==
The length of an adult shell varies between 23 mm and 38 mm.

This species was previously also regarded by Tryon as a variety of Clavatula muricata with a difference in color : the shell is yellowish brown, banded with bright red and ash-color.

== Distribution ==
This species occurs in the Atlantic Ocean in the Gulf of Guinea and off Senegal, Gabon and Angola.
