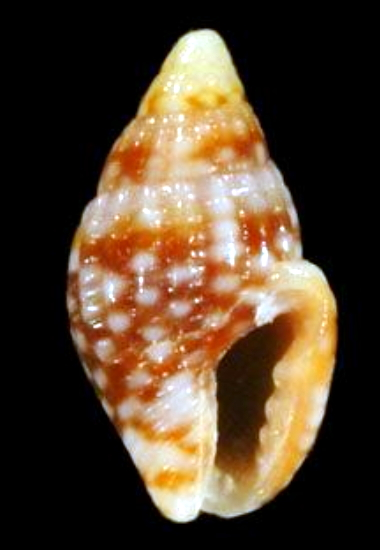
- Shell of Anachis lentiginosa (specimen at the Natural History Museum Rotterdam)

Scientific classification
- Kingdom: Animalia
- Phylum: Mollusca
- Class: Gastropoda
- Subclass: Caenogastropoda
- Order: Neogastropoda
- Family: Columbellidae
- Genus: Anachis
- Species: A. lentiginosa

Binomial name
- Anachis lentiginosa (Hinds, 1844)

Synonyms
- Anachis tabogensis Bartsch, 1931; Columbella guatemalensis Reeve, 1859; Columbella lentiginosa Hinds, 1844 superseded combination; Columbella pertusa Reeve, 1859; Columbella tesselata C. B. Adams, 1852 junior subjective synonym

= Anachis lentiginosa =

Species of gastropod

Anachis lentiginosa is a species of sea snail in the family Columbellidae, the dove snails.

== Description ==
(Original description in Latin) The shell is small, ovate, and blackish, speckled with white. The whorls are longitudinally plicate-ribbed, encircled by a white band below the suture, with the body whorl being transversely grooved. The aperture is blackish.

Under magnification, the speckled appearance of this small shell resolves into numerous, regularly arranged, articulated transverse bands, which are separated by furrows. These bands are most conspicuous on the last whorl; on the spire, they are interrupted by the rib-like folds.

== Distribution ==
This marine species occurs in the Pacific Ocean off Costa Rica, Nicaragua, Panama and Colombia.
