= Makiyamaia mammillata =

Scientific classification
- Kingdom: Animalia
- Phylum: Mollusca
- Class: Gastropoda
- Subclass: Caenogastropoda
- Order: Neogastropoda
- Superfamily: Conoidea
- Family: Clavatulidae
- Genus: Makiyamaia
- Species: M. mammillata

Binomial name
- Makiyamaia mammillata Kuroda, 1961

Species of gastropod

Makiyamaia mammillata is a species of sea snail, a marine gastropod mollusk in the family Clavatulidae.

== Distribution ==
This marine species is found in Tosa Bay, Japan and off Taiwan
