= Clavatula gracilior =

Scientific classification
- Kingdom: Animalia
- Phylum: Mollusca
- Class: Gastropoda
- Subclass: Caenogastropoda
- Order: Neogastropoda
- Superfamily: Conoidea
- Family: Clavatulidae
- Genus: Clavatula
- Species: C. gracilior

Binomial name
- Clavatula gracilior G.B. Sowerby II, 1870

Species of gastropod

Clavatula gracilior is a species of sea snail, a marine gastropod mollusk in the family Clavatulidae.

== Description ==
The thick, elongated shell has a pyramidal shape. It is red brown below the epidermis. The pyramidal spire is elongated and it lacks a tumid part anterior to the obtuse and not very prominent angle. The shell lacks a tumid varix at the top of each of the 12 whorls, which can be found in other species of this genus. The small aperture has a white color on top and below, but is yellow in the middle part. The sinus of the outer lip is almost square and extends deeply.

== Distribution ==
It is found in the Amazon rainforest.
