= Clavatula martensi =

Scientific classification
- Kingdom: Animalia
- Phylum: Mollusca
- Class: Gastropoda
- Subclass: Caenogastropoda
- Order: Neogastropoda
- Superfamily: Conoidea
- Family: Clavatulidae
- Genus: Clavatula
- Species: C. martensi

Binomial name
- Clavatula martensi Von Maltzan, 1883

Synonyms
- Pleurotoma caerulea Martens, E.C. von, 1881 (not Weinkauf)

Species of gastropod

Clavatula martensi is a species of sea snail, a marine gastropod mollusk in the family Clavatulidae.

== Description ==
The shell grows to a length of 31 mm.

== Distribution ==
This species occurs in the Atlantic Ocean off Angola.
