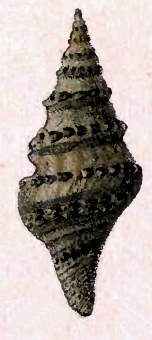
- Drawing of a shell of Clavatula virgineus

Scientific classification
- Kingdom: Animalia
- Phylum: Mollusca
- Class: Gastropoda
- Subclass: Caenogastropoda
- Order: Neogastropoda
- Superfamily: Conoidea
- Family: Clavatulidae
- Genus: Clavatula
- Species: C. virgineus

Binomial name
- Clavatula virgineus (Dillwyn, 1817)

Synonyms
- Murex virgineus Dillwyn, 1817

= Clavatula virgineus =

Species of gastropod

Clavatula virgineus, also known as the Virgin Olive, is a species of sea snail belonging to the Clavatulidae family of marine gastropod mollusks. These snails have elongated spiral shells with intricate patterns and bright colors. They inhabit various marine environments worldwide, from coastal areas to ocean depths. Clavatula virgineus plays important roles in marine ecosystems, contributing to biodiversity and ecological balance.

== Description ==
Clavatula virgineus is a species of sea snail characterized by its elongated spiral shell adorned with intricate patterns and vibrant hues. Typically, these shells can reach lengths of several centimeters, with variations in color and pattern occurring among individuals. The snail's soft body is protected within its shell, with sensory tentacles extending to detect food and environmental cues. Clavatula virgineus is often found in shallow coastal waters, where it feeds on small organisms and detritus.

== Distribution ==
This species occurs in the Red Sea and in the Atlantic Ocean off Guinea.
