= Makiyamaia orthopleura =

Scientific classification
- Kingdom: Animalia
- Phylum: Mollusca
- Class: Gastropoda
- Subclass: Caenogastropoda
- Order: Neogastropoda
- Superfamily: Conoidea
- Family: Clavatulidae
- Genus: Makiyamaia
- Species: M. orthopleura

Binomial name
- Makiyamaia orthopleura (Kilburn, 1983)

Synonyms
- Turris orthopleura Kilburn, 1983 (original combination)

Species of gastropod

Makiyamaia orthopleura is a species of sea snail, a marine gastropod mollusk in the family Clavatulidae.

== Description ==
The length of the shell attains 51 mm, its width is 15.2 mm.

== Distribution ==
This marine species occurs off KwaZulu-Natal and Transkei, South Africa.
