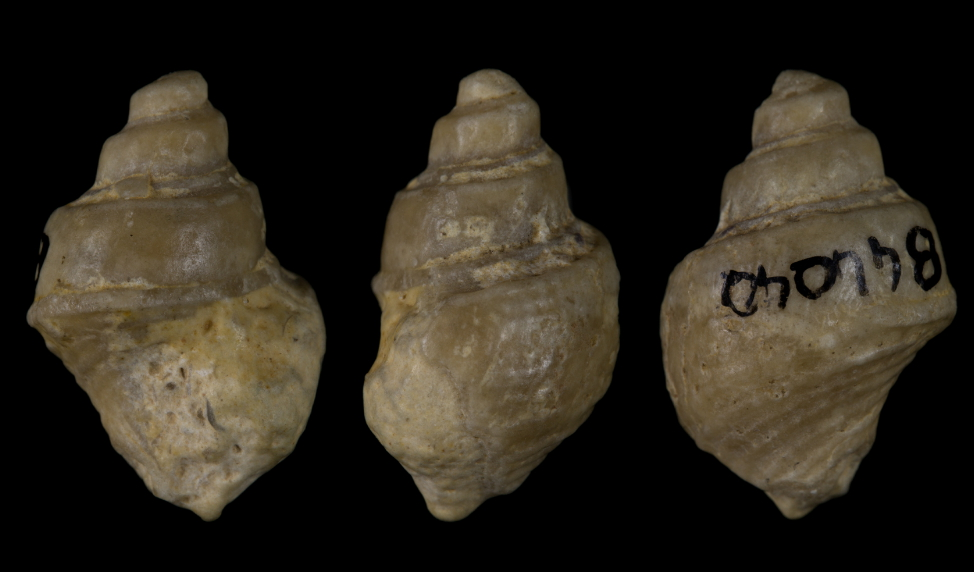
- Shell of † Clavatula pyramidum (syntype at MNHN, Paris)

Scientific classification
- Kingdom: Animalia
- Phylum: Mollusca
- Class: Gastropoda
- Subclass: Caenogastropoda
- Order: Neogastropoda
- Superfamily: Conoidea
- Family: Clavatulidae
- Genus: Clavatula
- Species: C. pyramidum

Binomial name
- Clavatula pyramidum Cuvillier, 1933

= Clavatula pyramidum =

Species of gastropod

Clavatula pyramidum is an extinct species of sea snails, a marine gastropod mollusc in the family Clavatulidae.

== Distribution ==
Fossils of this marine species were found in Eocene strata in Egypt.
