= Clavatula matthiasi =

Scientific classification
- Kingdom: Animalia
- Phylum: Mollusca
- Class: Gastropoda
- Subclass: Caenogastropoda
- Order: Neogastropoda
- Superfamily: Conoidea
- Family: Clavatulidae
- Genus: Clavatula
- Species: C. matthiasi

Binomial name
- Clavatula matthiasi Nolf, 2008

Species of gastropod

Clavatula matthiasi is a species of sea snail, a marine gastropod mollusk in the family Clavatulidae.

== Distribution ==
This species occurs in the Atlantic Ocean off Angola.
