= Makiyamaia subdeclivis =

Scientific classification
- Kingdom: Animalia
- Phylum: Mollusca
- Class: Gastropoda
- Subclass: Caenogastropoda
- Order: Neogastropoda
- Superfamily: Conoidea
- Family: Clavatulidae
- Genus: Makiyamaia
- Species: M. subdeclivis

Binomial name
- Makiyamaia subdeclivis (Yokoyama, M., 1926)

Species of gastropod

Makiyamaia subdeclivis is a species of sea snail, a marine gastropod mollusc in the family Clavatulidae.

== Description ==
The length of the shell varies between 40 mm and 55 mm.

== Distribution ==
This marine species occurs off Japan and in the South China Sea.
