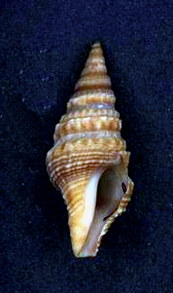
- Apertural view of a shell of Clavatula bimarginata (museum specimen at Naturalis Biodiversity Center)

Scientific classification
- Kingdom: Animalia
- Phylum: Mollusca
- Class: Gastropoda
- Subclass: Caenogastropoda
- Order: Neogastropoda
- Superfamily: Conoidea
- Family: Clavatulidae
- Genus: Clavatula
- Species: C. bimarginata

Binomial name
- Clavatula bimarginata (Lamarck, 1822)

Synonyms
- Pleurotoma bimarginata Lamarck, 1822

= Clavatula bimarginata =

Species of gastropod

Clavatula bimarginata, common name the two-edged turrid, is a species of sea snail, a marine gastropod mollusk in the family Clavatulidae.

== Description ==
The size of an adult shell varies between 18 mm and 60 mm.

== Distribution ==
This marine species occurs in the Atlantic Ocean from Mauritania to South Africa.
