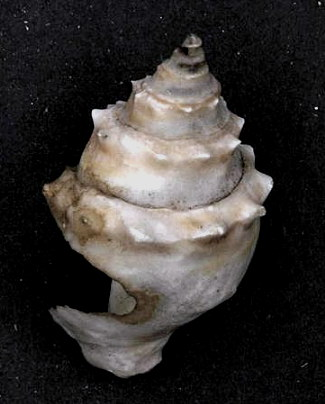
- Apertural view of a shell of Clavatula imperialis (museum specimen at Naturalis Biodiversity Center)

Scientific classification
- Kingdom: Animalia
- Phylum: Mollusca
- Class: Gastropoda
- Subclass: Caenogastropoda
- Order: Neogastropoda
- Superfamily: Conoidea
- Family: Clavatulidae
- Genus: Clavatula
- Species: C. imperialis

Binomial name
- Clavatula imperialis Lamarck, 1816

= Clavatula imperialis =

Species of gastropod

Clavatula imperialis is a species of sea snail, a marine gastropod mollusk in the family Clavatulidae.

== Description ==
The size of an adult shell varies between 25 mm and 50 mm. The ovate shell is short and ventricose. It is clothed with a thick, dark olive-colored epidermis. The whorls are angulated above, the angle having a row of scale-like tubercles. The columella is covered with a thick white callus. The interior of the aperture is stained above and below with violet.

== Distribution ==
This species occurs in the Atlantic Ocean between Democratic Republic of the Congo and Angola.
