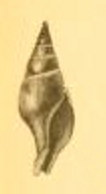
- Drawing of a shell of Clavatula kraepelini

Scientific classification
- Kingdom: Animalia
- Phylum: Mollusca
- Class: Gastropoda
- Subclass: Caenogastropoda
- Order: Neogastropoda
- Superfamily: Conoidea
- Family: Clavatulidae
- Genus: Clavatula
- Species: C. kraepelini

Binomial name
- Clavatula kraepelini (Strebel, 1914)

Synonyms
- Pusionella kraepelini Strebel, 1914

= Clavatula kraepelini =

Species of gastropod

Clavatula kraepelini is a species of sea snail, a marine gastropod mollusk in the family Clavatulidae.

== Description ==
The size of an adult shell varies between 25 mm and 37 mm.

The shiny shell has a maroon color. Sometimes its borders are whitish, as well as the first whorls are shiny and colorless. The shell contains probably 10 - 11 whorls (as no specimen is complete). These are slightly arched and weakly bulging at the seam. The swollen body whorl is laterally somewhat flattened and is curved to the left from its base. The outermost layer of the shell is covered with a shiny, colorless callus.

== Distribution ==
This species occurs in the Atlantic Ocean between Senegal and Angola.
