= Makiyamaia sibogae =

Scientific classification
- Kingdom: Animalia
- Phylum: Mollusca
- Class: Gastropoda
- Subclass: Caenogastropoda
- Order: Neogastropoda
- Superfamily: Conoidea
- Family: Clavatulidae
- Genus: Makiyamaia
- Species: M. sibogae

Binomial name
- Makiyamaia sibogae Shuto, 1970

Species of gastropod

Makiyamaia sibogae is a species of sea snail, a marine gastropod mollusk in the family Clavatulidae.

== Distribution ==
This species occurs in the Pacific Ocean off Indonesia at depths of more than 800 m.
