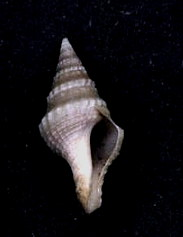
- Apertural view of a shell of Clavatula mystica

Scientific classification
- Kingdom: Animalia
- Phylum: Mollusca
- Class: Gastropoda
- Subclass: Caenogastropoda
- Order: Neogastropoda
- Superfamily: Conoidea
- Family: Clavatulidae
- Genus: Clavatula
- Species: C. mystica

Binomial name
- Clavatula mystica (Reeve, 1843)

Synonyms
- Clavatula sacerdos (Reeve, 1845) ·; Pleurotoma mystica Reeve, 1843; Pleurotoma sacerdos Reeve, 1845 ·

= Clavatula mystica =

Species of gastropod

Clavatula mystica is a species of sea snail, a marine gastropod mollusk in the family Clavatulidae.

== Description ==
The size of an adult shell varies between 18 mm and 47 mm.

== Distribution ==
This species occurs in the Atlantic Ocean from the Western Sahara to Ghana; also off the Canary Islands, Ivory Coast and North Angola.
