= Clavatula congoensis =

Scientific classification
- Kingdom: Animalia
- Phylum: Mollusca
- Class: Gastropoda
- Subclass: Caenogastropoda
- Order: Neogastropoda
- Superfamily: Conoidea
- Family: Clavatulidae
- Genus: Clavatula
- Species: C. congoensis

Binomial name
- Clavatula congoensis Nolf & Verstraeten, 2008

Species of gastropod

Clavatula congoensis is a species of sea snail, a marine gastropod mollusk in the family Clavatulidae.

== Description ==
Clavatula congoensis has a conical shell that is elongated, tapering to a sharp point. The shell varies in length but typically reaches around 16 mm when fully grown. Its coloration ranges from light brown to pale yellow, often with darker spiral bands that accentuate the shell's ridges and grooves. The shell surface is generally sculptured with longitudinal ribs and spiral striations, providing it with a textured appearance.

== Distribution ==
This species occurs in the Atlantic Ocean off the Republic of Congo.
