= Clavatula xanteni =

Scientific classification
- Kingdom: Animalia
- Phylum: Mollusca
- Class: Gastropoda
- Subclass: Caenogastropoda
- Order: Neogastropoda
- Superfamily: Conoidea
- Family: Clavatulidae
- Genus: Clavatula
- Species: C. xanteni

Binomial name
- Clavatula xanteni Nolf & Verstraeten, 2006

Species of gastropod

Clavatula xanteni is a species of sea snail, a marine gastropod mollusk in the family Clavatulidae.

== Distribution ==
This species occurs off the mouth of the Congo River and in North Angola.
