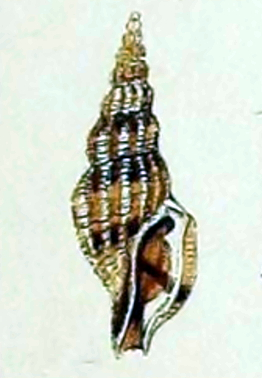
- Original image of a shell of Bellacythara bella

Scientific classification
- Kingdom: Animalia
- Phylum: Mollusca
- Class: Gastropoda
- Subclass: Caenogastropoda
- Order: Neogastropoda
- Superfamily: Conoidea
- Family: Mangeliidae
- Genus: Bellacythara
- Species: B. bella

Binomial name
- Bellacythara bella (Hinds, 1843)

Synonyms
- Clavatula bella Hinds, 1843; Mangilia bella (Hinds, 1843)

= Bellacythara bella =

Species of gastropod

Bellacythara bella is a species of sea snail, a marine gastropod mollusk in the family Mangeliidae.

== Description ==
The length of the shell attains 8 mm.

The slender shell has a fusiform shape, attenuated below. Its color is pale yellowish brown. The whorls are rounded, longitudinally ribbed, crossed with white raised lines, banded with darker brown round the upper part. The ribs are slender, furnished with small scattered granules, running into a simple suture. The outer lip is thickened. The sinus is small and rather wide.

== Distribution ==
This marine species occurs in the Pacific Ocean off Costa Rica and Panama.
