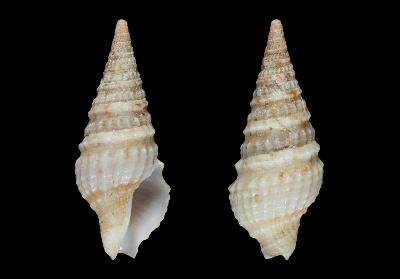
- Shell of Clavatula petzyae (holotype in the MNHN, Paris)

Scientific classification
- Kingdom: Animalia
- Phylum: Mollusca
- Class: Gastropoda
- Subclass: Caenogastropoda
- Order: Neogastropoda
- Superfamily: Conoidea
- Family: Clavatulidae
- Genus: Clavatula
- Species: C. petzyae

Binomial name
- Clavatula petzyae Boyer & Ryall, 2006

= Clavatula petzyae =

Species of gastropod

Clavatula petzyae is a species of sea snail, a marine gastropod mollusk in the family Clavatulidae.

== Description ==
The shell grows to a length of 11 mm. The adult holotype shell is approximately 16.5 x 6.3 mm, having a smooth, shiny texture with a light amber hue. The teleoconch consists of around 8 narrow whorls with distinctive spires.

== Distribution ==
This species occurs in the Atlantic Ocean off Ghana.
