= Clavatula smithi =

Scientific classification
- Kingdom: Animalia
- Phylum: Mollusca
- Class: Gastropoda
- Subclass: Caenogastropoda
- Order: Neogastropoda
- Superfamily: Conoidea
- Family: Clavatulidae
- Genus: Clavatula
- Species: C. smithi

Binomial name
- Clavatula smithi Knudsen, 1952

Species of gastropod

Clavatula smithi is a species of sea snail, a marine gastropod mollusk in the family Clavatulidae.

== Distribution ==
This species occurs in the Atlantic Ocean off West Africa.
