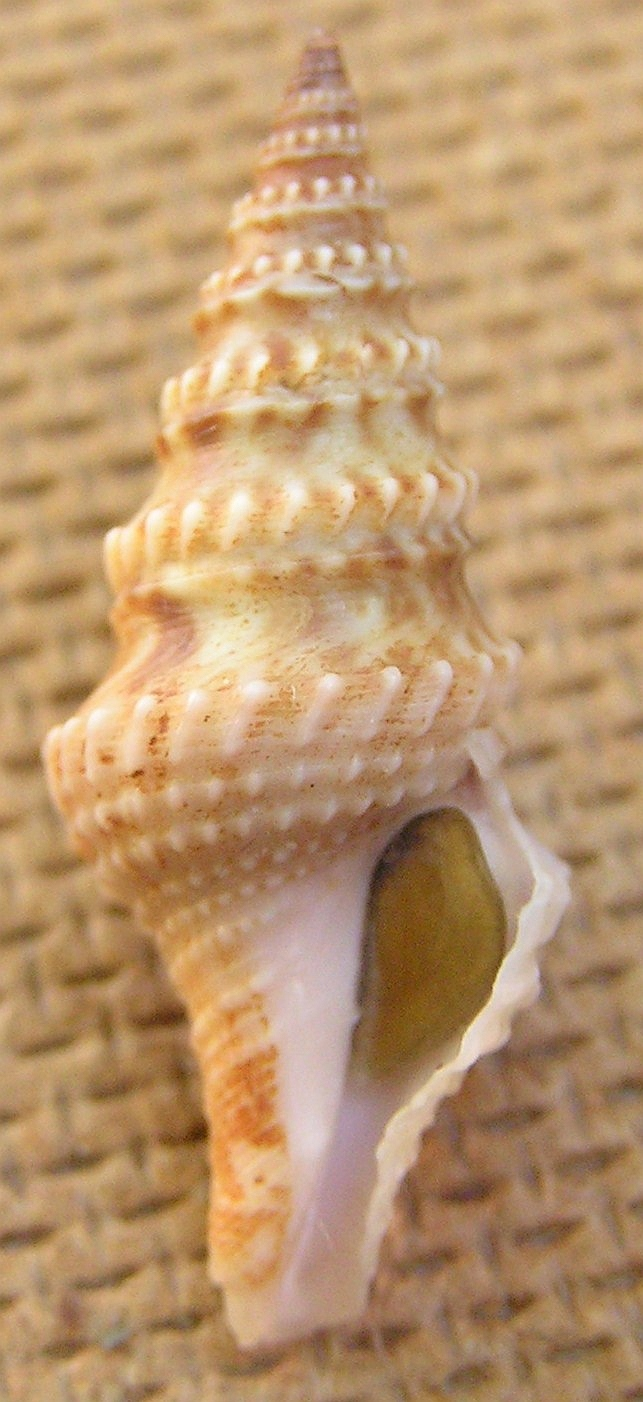
- Apertural view of Clavatula lelieuri

Scientific classification
- Kingdom: Animalia
- Phylum: Mollusca
- Class: Gastropoda
- Subclass: Caenogastropoda
- Order: Neogastropoda
- Superfamily: Conoidea
- Family: Clavatulidae
- Genus: Clavatula
- Species: C. lelieuri

Binomial name
- Clavatula lelieuri (Récluz, 1851)

Synonyms
- Pleurotoma lelieuri Recluz, 1851

= Clavatula lelieuri =

Species of gastropod

Clavatula lelieuri is a species of sea snail, a marine gastropod mollusk in the family Clavatulidae.

== Description ==
The size of an adult shell varies between 20 mm and 40 mm. The turreted shell is yellowish brown. The upper portion of the whorls are covered with large brown maculations and a revolving series of small brown spots just above the lower carina. The whorls are smooth and concave above, with revolving raised lines below the bicarinated periphery.

== Distribution ==
This species occurs in the Atlantic Ocean off West Africa (Senegal, Guinea, Gabon)
