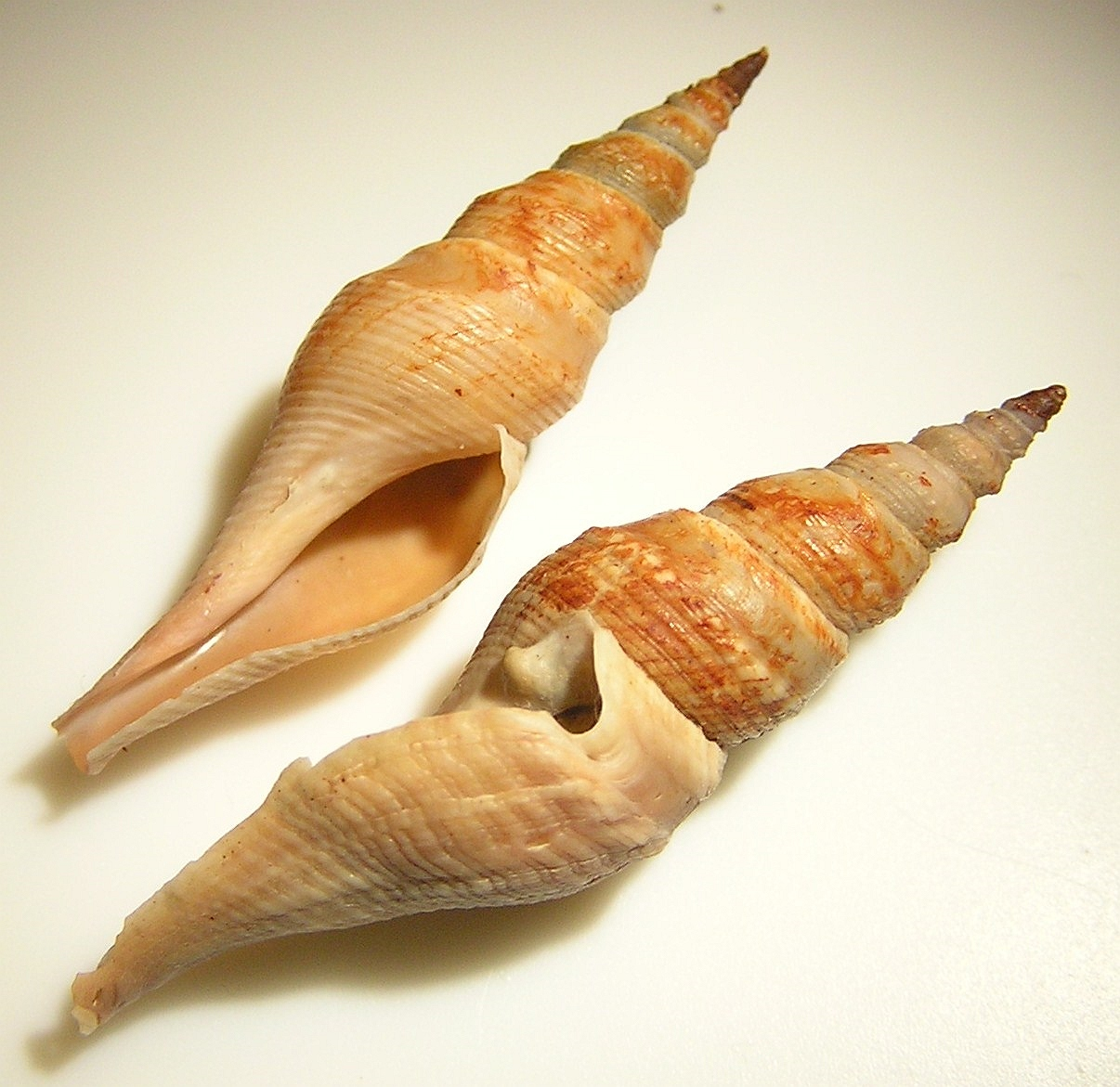
- Clavatula flammulata

Scientific classification
- Kingdom: Animalia
- Phylum: Mollusca
- Class: Gastropoda
- Subclass: Caenogastropoda
- Order: Neogastropoda
- Superfamily: Conoidea
- Family: Clavatulidae
- Genus: Clavatula
- Species: C. flammulata

Binomial name
- Clavatula flammulata Knudsen, 1952

= Clavatula flammulata =

Species of gastropod

Clavatula flammulata is a species of sea snail, a marine gastropod mollusk in the family Clavatulidae.

== Description ==
The size of an adult shell varies between 38 mm and 48 mm.

== Distribution ==
This species occurs in the Atlantic Ocean along Gabon.

Fossils were found in Pleistocene strata in Morocco.
