= Makiyamaia scalaria =

Scientific classification
- Kingdom: Animalia
- Phylum: Mollusca
- Class: Gastropoda
- Subclass: Caenogastropoda
- Order: Neogastropoda
- Superfamily: Conoidea
- Family: Clavatulidae
- Genus: Makiyamaia
- Species: M. scalaria

Binomial name
- Makiyamaia scalaria (Barnard, 1958)

Synonyms
- Surcula scalaria Barnard, 1958 (original combination); Turricula scalaria (Barnard, 1958)

Species of gastropod

Makiyamaia scalaria is a species of sea snail, a marine gastropod mollusk in the family Clavatulidae.

== Distribution ==
This marine species occurs off Cape Point, South Africa
