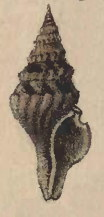
- Drawing of a shell of Makiyamaia gravis

Scientific classification
- Kingdom: Animalia
- Phylum: Mollusca
- Class: Gastropoda
- Subclass: Caenogastropoda
- Order: Neogastropoda
- Superfamily: Conoidea
- Family: Clavatulidae
- Genus: Makiyamaia
- Species: M. gravis

Binomial name
- Makiyamaia gravis (Hinds, 1843)

Synonyms
- Clavatula gravis (Hinds, 1843); Clionella gravis (Hinds, 1843); Pleurotoma gravis Hinds, 1843 (original combination)

= Makiyamaia gravis =

Species of gastropod

Makiyamaia gravis is a species of sea snail, a marine gastropod mollusk in the family Clavatulidae.

== Description ==
The height of the shell attains 37 mm.

== Distribution ==
This marine species occurs off the Agulhas Bank, South Africa
