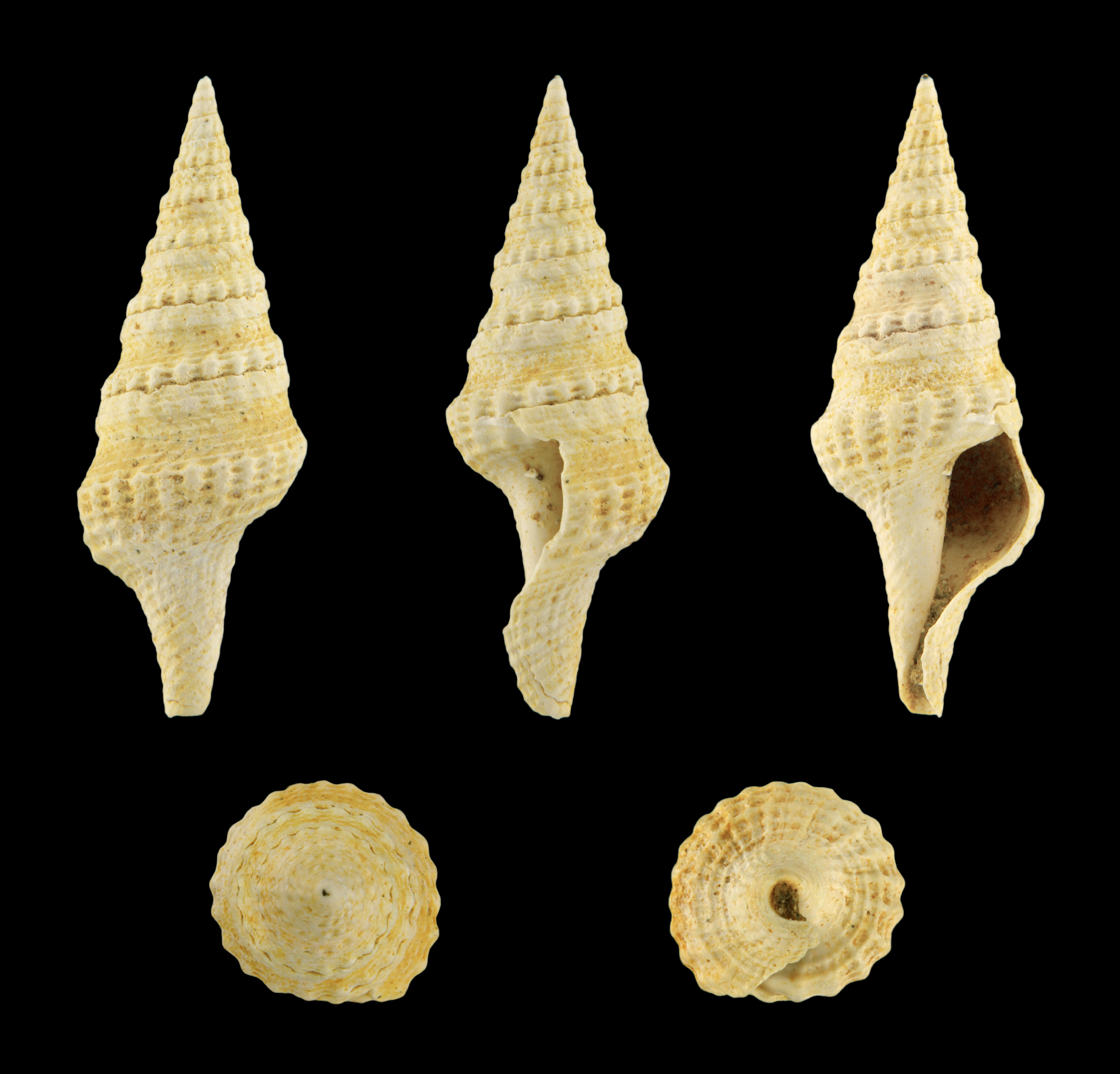
- Shell of † Clavatula concatenata

Scientific classification
- Kingdom: Animalia
- Phylum: Mollusca
- Class: Gastropoda
- Subclass: Caenogastropoda
- Order: Neogastropoda
- Superfamily: Conoidea
- Family: Clavatulidae
- Genus: Clavatula
- Species: C. concatenata

Binomial name
- Clavatula concatenata (Grateloup, 1832)

Synonyms
- † Pleurotoma concatenata Grateloup, 1832

= Clavatula concatenata =

Species of gastropod

Clavatula concatenata is an extinct species of sea snails, a marine gastropod mollusc in the family Clavatulidae.

== Description ==
The shell of Clavatula concatenata is characterized by its elongated, fusiform shape and intricate patterns. The length of the shell can reach up to 15 mm.

This species represents the smallest type of Pleurotoma (i.e. original genus) from Corsica. Its spire, relatively short, is composed of slightly depressed subcylindrical whorls, ending on each side with a slightly prominent spiny ridge. In the only specimen we are aware of, the lower ridge is more developed, and although worn, traces of the spines it must have borne are still visible. The interval is adorned with very fine transverse striations.

The whorls are adorned with tubercles or short spines at the suture, and the aperture is oval. The columellar lip is smooth, arcuate, and callous behind, while the outer lip is thin and arcuated with the anal sinus situated below the sutural coronal.

== Distribution ==
Fossils of this marine species were found in Oligocene strata in Aquitaine, France. Also found in Italy in Piedmont, in the Modena region, in the Piacenza and Parma regions and Tuscany; in Portugal and also in the Vienna Basin.

These fossils indicate that the species was present in marine environments during this geological period.
