= Paraclavatula =

Scientific classification
- Kingdom: Animalia
- Phylum: Mollusca
- Class: Gastropoda
- Subclass: Caenogastropoda
- Order: Neogastropoda
- Superfamily: Conoidea
- Family: Clavatulidae
- Genus: Paraclavatula; Kantor, Fedosov & Puillandre, 2018

Type species
- Clavatula delphinae Nolf, 2008

Genus of gastropods

Paraclavatula is a genus of sea snails, marine gastropod mollusks in the family Clavatulidae.

== Species ==
- Paraclavatula christianae (Nolf, 2011)
- Paraclavatula delphinae (Nolf, 2008)
- Paraclavatula pseudomystica (Nolf, 2008)
