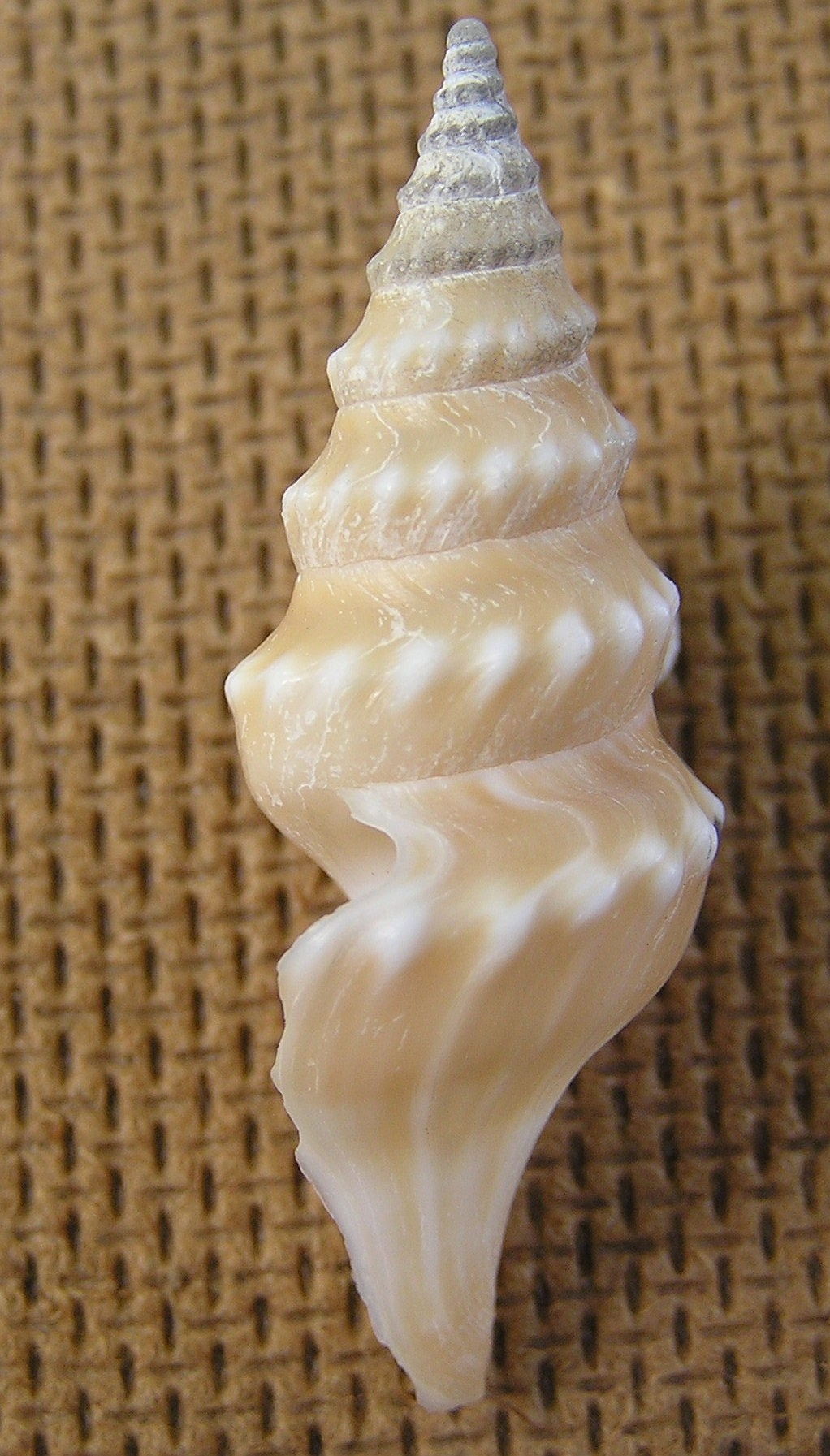
- A shell of Makiyamaia coreanica

Scientific classification
- Kingdom: Animalia
- Phylum: Mollusca
- Class: Gastropoda
- Subclass: Caenogastropoda
- Order: Neogastropoda
- Superfamily: Conoidea
- Family: Clavatulidae
- Genus: Makiyamaia; Kuroda, 1961

Type species
- Pleurotoma coreanica Adams & Reeve, 1850

= Makiyamaia =

Genus of gastropods

Makiyamaia is a genus of sea snails, marine gastropod mollusks in the family Clavatulidae.

== Distribution ==
This marine species is known as fossils from the Miocene to the Recent of Japan, the Pliocene of Okinawa. In Recent times it is found in the South China Sea, Korea and the Philippines and off South Africa.

== Species ==
Species within the genus Makiyamaia include:

- Makiyamaia coreanica (Adams & Reeve, 1850)
- Makiyamaia cornulabrum Kuroda, 1961
- † Makiyamaia decorata Oleinik 1991
- Makiyamaia gravis (Hinds, 1843)
- Makiyamaia mammillata Kuroda, 1961
- Makiyamaia orthopleura (Kilburn, 1983)
- Makiyamaia scalaria (Barnard, 1958)
- Makiyamaia sibogae Shuto, 1970
- Makiyamaia subdeclivis (Yokoyama, M., 1926)
