= Makiyamaia cornulabrum =

Scientific classification
- Kingdom: Animalia
- Phylum: Mollusca
- Class: Gastropoda
- Subclass: Caenogastropoda
- Order: Neogastropoda
- Superfamily: Conoidea
- Family: Clavatulidae
- Genus: Makiyamaia
- Species: M. cornulabrum

Binomial name
- Makiyamaia cornulabrum Kuroda, 1961

Species of gastropod

Makiyamaia cornulabrum is a species of sea snail, a marine gastropod mollusk in the family Clavatulidae.

== Distribution ==
This species occurs in the Pacific Ocean off Japan.
