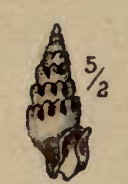
- Drawing of a shell of Splendrillia albicans

Scientific classification
- Kingdom: Animalia
- Phylum: Mollusca
- Class: Gastropoda
- Subclass: Caenogastropoda
- Order: Neogastropoda
- Superfamily: Conoidea
- Family: Drilliidae
- Genus: Splendrillia
- Species: S. albicans

Binomial name
- Splendrillia albicans (Hinds, 1843)

Synonyms
- Clavatula albicans Hinds, 1843 (basionym); Defrancia albicans (Hinds, 1843); Mangilia albicans (Hinds, 1843); Pleurotoma albicans (Hinds, 1843)

= Splendrillia albicans =

Species of gastropod

Splendrillia albicans is a species of sea snail, a marine gastropod mollusk in the family Drilliidae.

== Description ==
The shell is slightly longitudinally ribbed with the ribs nodose at the sutures, with revolving striae towards the base of the body whorl . The shell is whitish, more or less tinged with chestnut. The length of the shell is 6 mm.

== Distribution ==
This species occurs in the demersal zone of the Straits of Malacca at a depth of 30 m.
