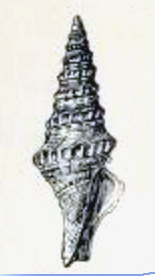
- Original drawing of a shell of Clavatula decorata

Scientific classification
- Kingdom: Animalia
- Phylum: Mollusca
- Class: Gastropoda
- Subclass: Caenogastropoda
- Order: Neogastropoda
- Superfamily: Conoidea
- Family: Clavatulidae
- Genus: Clavatula
- Species: C. decorata

Binomial name
- Clavatula decorata G.B. Sowerby III, 1916

= Clavatula decorata =

Species of gastropod

Clavatula decorata is a species of sea snail, a marine gastropod mollusk in the family Clavatulidae.

== Description ==
The length of the shell attains 21 mm, its width 8 mm.

(From the original description) The fusiform shell is one of striking character. The spire is acutely turreted and contains 10 whorls. The whorls are unusually concave, with a stout prominent keel, crossed by numerous oblong somewhat oblique white tubercles or short plicae, which are rendered more conspicuous by a brown intersecting spiral line.

== Distribution ==
This species occurs in the Atlantic Ocean off Sierra Leone.
