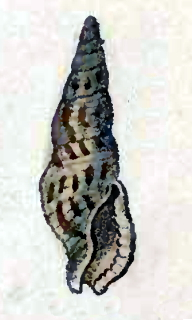
- Image of a shell of Daphnella flammea

Scientific classification
- Kingdom: Animalia
- Phylum: Mollusca
- Class: Gastropoda
- Subclass: Caenogastropoda
- Order: Neogastropoda
- Superfamily: Conoidea
- Family: Raphitomidae
- Genus: Daphnella
- Species: D. flammea

Binomial name
- Daphnella flammea (Hinds, 1843)

Synonyms
- Clavatula flammea Hinds, 1843; Daphnella (Daphnella) flammea (Hinds, 1843)

= Daphnella flammea =

Species of gastropod

Daphnella flammea is a species of sea snail, a marine gastropod mollusk in the family Raphitomidae.

== Description ==
The length of the shell varies between 10 mm and 15 mm.

The shell is spirally closely striated. The outer lip is minutely crenulated within. The sinus is somewhat obsolete. The shell is whitish, ornamented with waved longitudinal chestnut flames.

== Distribution ==
This marine species occurs off New Guinea, Japan and in China Sea; also off Réunion
