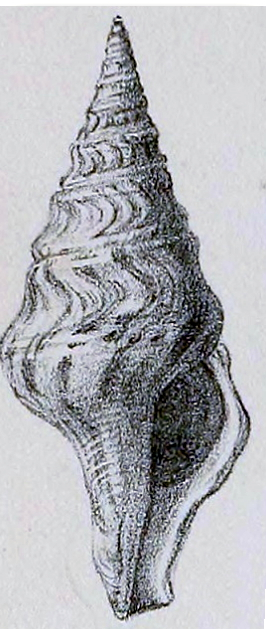
- Drawing of a shell of Clavatula gabonensis (holotype)

Scientific classification
- Kingdom: Animalia
- Phylum: Mollusca
- Class: Gastropoda
- Subclass: Caenogastropoda
- Order: Neogastropoda
- Superfamily: Conoidea
- Family: Clavatulidae
- Genus: Clavatula
- Species: C. gabonensis

Binomial name
- Clavatula gabonensis Melvill, 1923

= Clavatula gabonensis =

Species of gastropod

Clavatula gabonensis, common name the Gabon turrid, is a species of sea snail from the family Clavatulidae. This marine gastropod mollusk occupies benthic habitats in tropical climatic regions.

== Description ==
The shell grows to a length of 35 mm.

The pyramidate shell is smooth throughout. It contains eleven whorls, the two in the protoconch white, plain, and bulbous. The remainder are concave, well exhibiting incremental lines of growth, elegantly and regularly ornamented with fluctuate brown lines, and, on the body whorl, longitudinal flames. The periphery is conspicuously angular and bicarinate. The aperture is ovate. The outer lip has a median angle, sinus wide, the siphonal canal moderate, very slightly recurved. The columellar margin is straight.

To this the only allied species is C.lelieuri, Récluz. Both species agree in complete smoothness of surface, with no sign of tubercles or spines which characterize all others of the genus. But it differs from the species just named in the very conspicuous bicarinate angle at the periphery of the body-whorl, thereby rendering the shell attenuate at either extremity, while the character and disposition of the brown markings differ likewise.

Data such as maturity, morphometric measurements or life span have not been studied in this species. Few information is known regarding the life cycle and mating behavior of sea snail. This species is a non-broadcast spawner. Life cycle does not include trochophore stage.

== Distribution ==
This species occurs in the Atlantic Ocean along Senegal and Gabon.

== Conservation status ==
This species has not yet been evaluated by IUCN.
