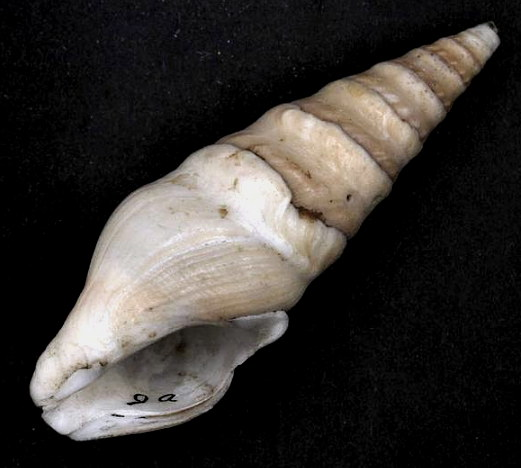
- Apertural view of a shell of Clavatula taxea (museum specimen at Naturalis Biodiversity Center)

Scientific classification
- Kingdom: Animalia
- Phylum: Mollusca
- Class: Gastropoda
- Subclass: Caenogastropoda
- Order: Neogastropoda
- Superfamily: Conoidea
- Family: Clavatulidae
- Genus: Clavatula
- Species: C. taxea

Binomial name
- Clavatula taxea (Röding, 1798)

Synonyms
- Clavatula rufanensis Turton, W.H., 1932; Clavatula taxus affinis Chemnitz, J.H., 1786; Clionella taxea (Röding, 1798); Clionella taxus Chemnitz, 1786; Murex taxus Dillwyn, 1817; Pleurotoma taxus G. B. Sowerby I, 1825; Turris taxea Röding, 1798

= Clavatula taxea =

Species of gastropod

Clavatula taxea, common name the yew turrid, is a species of sea snail, a marine gastropod mollusk in the family Clavatulidae.

== Description ==
The size of an adult shell varies between 50 mm and 75 mm. The color of the shell is yellowish brown, nexuously lineated with chestnut, under a thick olivaceous brown epidermis. The whorls are constricted above, slightly nodulosely longitudinally plicate below, and flexuously longitudinally striate. The color of the aperture is brownish.

== Distribution ==
This marine species occurs off False Bay to northeast of Cape of Good Hope, South Africa
