= Clavatula colini =

- Drawing of a shell of Clavatula colini

Scientific classification
- Kingdom: Animalia
- Phylum: Mollusca
- Class: Gastropoda
- Subclass: Caenogastropoda
- Order: Neogastropoda
- Superfamily: Conoidea
- Family: Clavatulidae
- Genus: Clavatula
- Species: C. colini

Binomial name
- Clavatula colini Von Maltzan, 1883

Species of gastropod

Clavatula colini is a species of sea snail, a marine gastropod mollusk in the family Clavatulidae.

== Description ==
The color of the shell is rosaceous, with a superior, and an inferior brown band. The spire is longer than most species in this genus. It has a pronounced siphonal canal

== Distribution ==
This species occurs in the Atlantic Ocean off Senegal.
