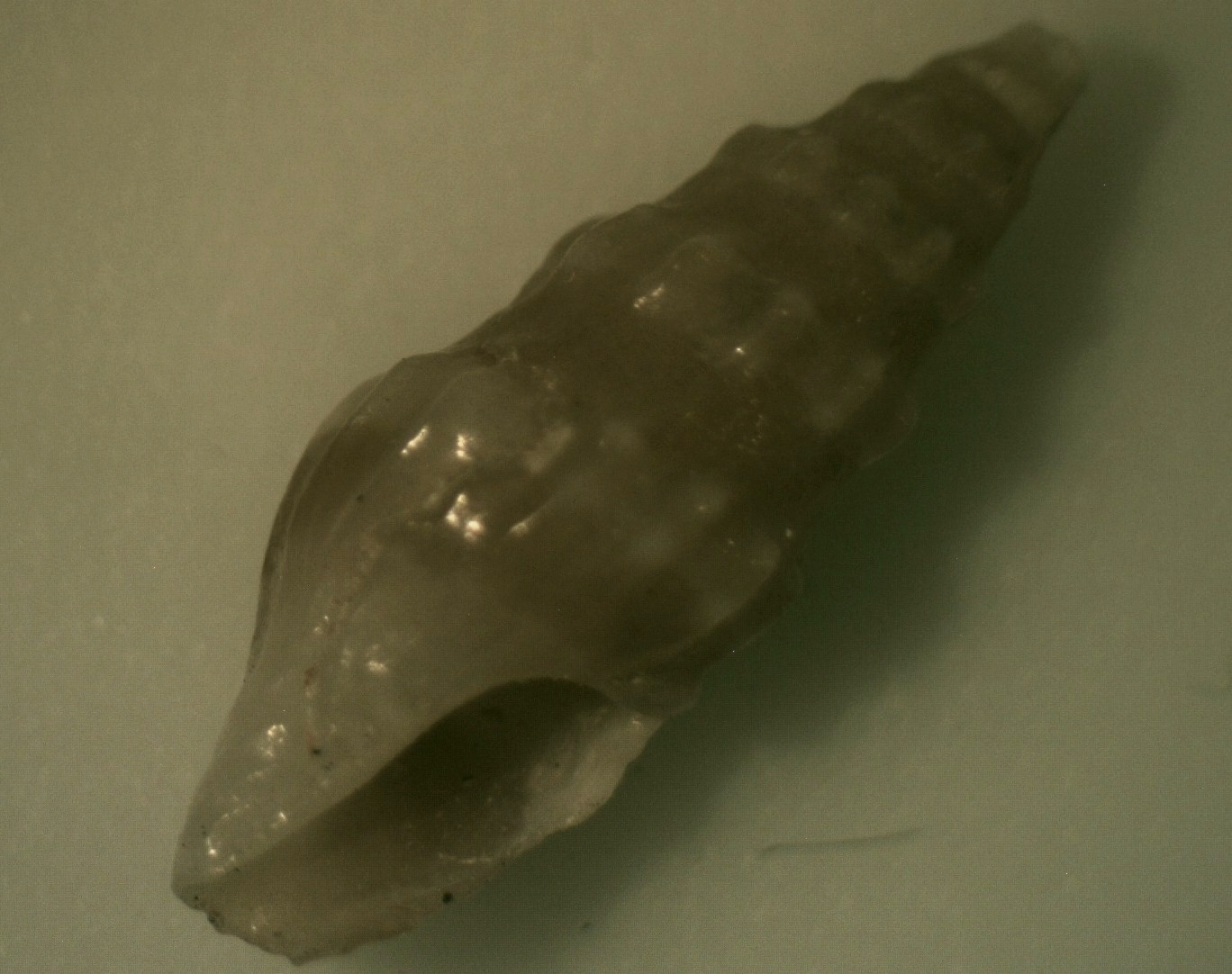

Scientific classification
- Kingdom: Animalia
- Phylum: Mollusca
- Class: Gastropoda
- Subclass: Caenogastropoda
- Order: Neogastropoda
- Superfamily: Conoidea
- Family: Drilliidae
- Genus: Clavus
- Species: C. laetus

Binomial name
- Clavus laetus (Hinds, 1843)

Synonyms
- Clavatula laeta Hinds, 1843 (basionym); Clavus laetus (Hinds, 1843); Drillia laeta (Hinds, 1843); Drillia (Clavus) laeta (Hinds, 1843); Pleurotoma (Clavus) laeta (Hinds, 1843); Splendrillia laeta (Hinds, 1843)

= Clavus laetus =

Species of gastropod

Clavus laetus is a species of sea snail, a marine gastropod mollusk in the family Drilliidae.

This species is also mentioned as Clavus laetus.

== Description ==
The size of an adult shell varies between 8 mm and 20 mm.

The smooth shell is polished. The whorls show a strongly tuberculated shoulder. The body whorl shows a second inferior row of small, sometimes obsolete tubercles. The shell is white, banded with brown, and the band is often more or less interrupted.

== Distribution ==
This species occurs in the demersal zone of the tropical Indo-Pacific off New Guinea, New Caledonia, the Strait of Macassar, Indonesia, the Solomons and the Philippines; also off Australia (Northern Territory, Queensland, Western Australia).
