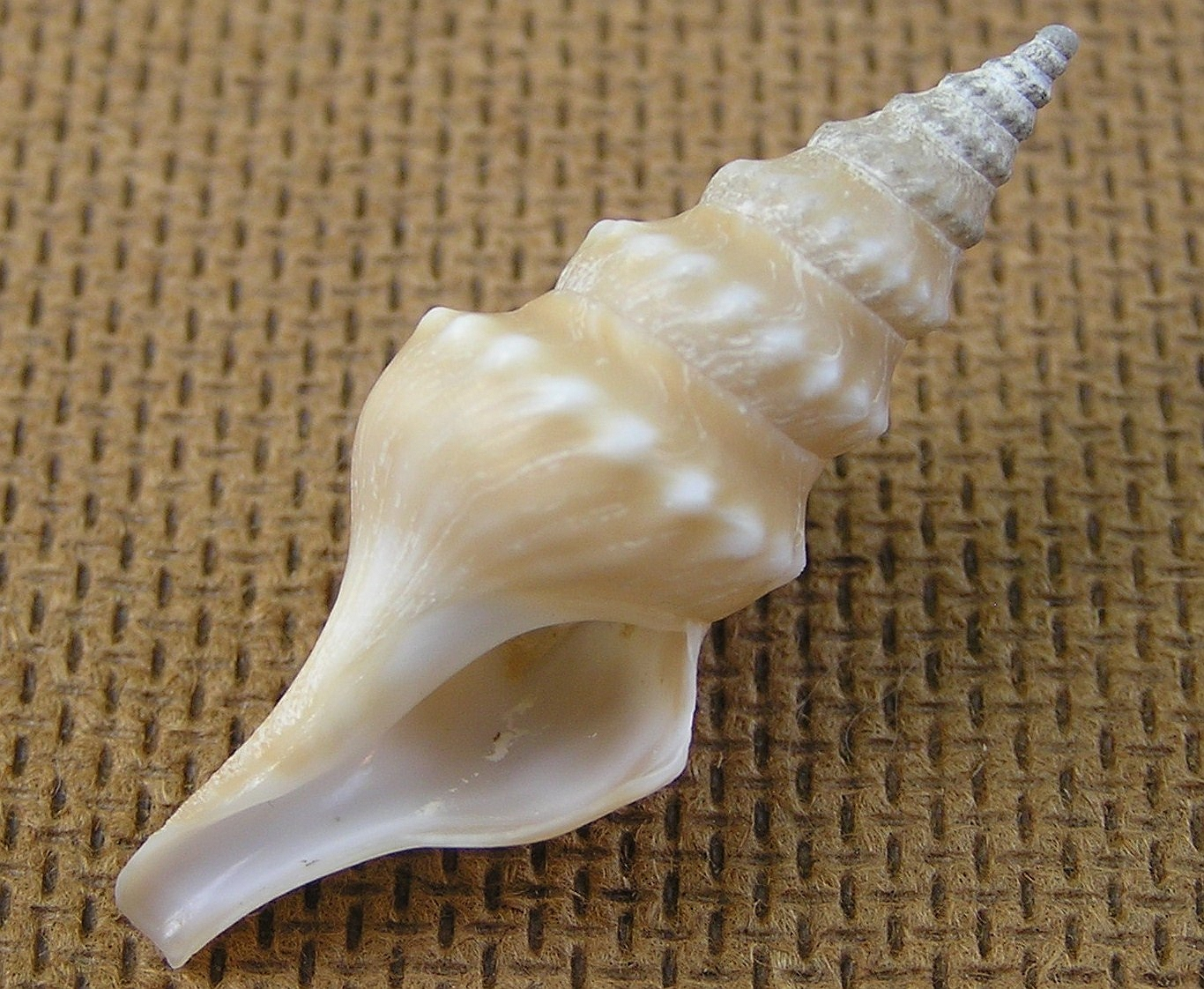
- Apertural view of a shell of Makiyamaia coreanica

Scientific classification
- Kingdom: Animalia
- Phylum: Mollusca
- Class: Gastropoda
- Subclass: Caenogastropoda
- Order: Neogastropoda
- Superfamily: Conoidea
- Family: Clavatulidae
- Genus: Makiyamaia
- Species: M. coreanica

Binomial name
- Makiyamaia coreanica (Adams & Reeve, 1850)

Synonyms
- Leucosyrinx coreanica (Adams & Reeve, 1850). Kuroda and Habe, 1952: 62; Pleurotoma coreanica Adams & Reeve, 1850; Pleurotoma shimomatana Yokoyama, 1926; Pleurotoma subdeclivis Yokoyama, 1928; Turricula coreanica (Adams & Reeve, 1850); Turricula shimomatana (Yokoyama, 1926)

= Makiyamaia coreanica =

Species of gastropod

Makiyamaia coreanica is a species of sea snail, a marine gastropod mollusk in the family Clavatulidae.

== Description ==
The size of an adult shell varies between 25 mm and 50.9 mm. The whorls are angular and tuberculated in the middle. These tubercles develop from more or less indistinct oblique folds or ribs, everywhere closely encircled by striae. The color of the shell is light yellowish brown, the tubercles lighter.

== Distribution ==
This marine species occurs off Korea, Japan and Taiwan; also reported from the China seas. .
