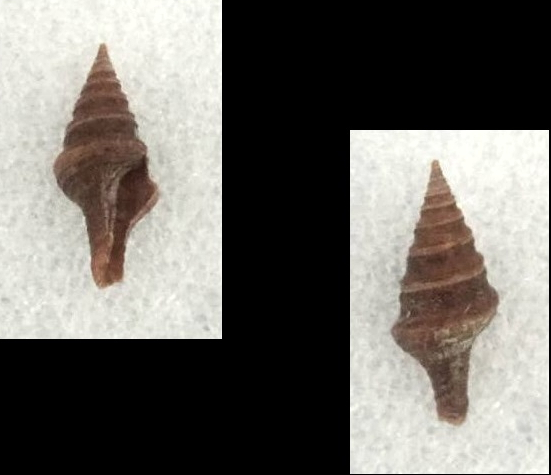
- Shell of Clavatula strebeli

Scientific classification
- Kingdom: Animalia
- Phylum: Mollusca
- Class: Gastropoda
- Subclass: Caenogastropoda
- Order: Neogastropoda
- Superfamily: Conoidea
- Family: Clavatulidae
- Genus: Clavatula
- Species: C. strebeli

Binomial name
- Clavatula strebeli Knudsen, 1952

= Clavatula strebeli =

Species of gastropod

Clavatula strebeli is a species of sea snail, a marine gastropod mollusk in the family Clavatulidae.

== Description ==
The shell grows to a length of 30 mm.

== Distribution ==
This species occurs in the Atlantic Ocean off Gabon.
