= Clavatula knudseni =

Scientific classification
- Kingdom: Animalia
- Phylum: Mollusca
- Class: Gastropoda
- Subclass: Caenogastropoda
- Order: Neogastropoda
- Superfamily: Conoidea
- Family: Clavatulidae
- Genus: Clavatula
- Species: C. knudseni

Binomial name
- Clavatula knudseni Nolf & Verstraeten, 2007

Species of gastropod

Clavatula knudseni is a species of sea snail, a marine gastropod mollusc in the family Clavatulidae.

== Distribution ==
This species occurs in the Atlantic Ocean off West Africa (Senegal, Gambia and Ivory Coast).
