= Clavatula asamusiensis =

Scientific classification
- Kingdom: Animalia
- Phylum: Mollusca
- Class: Gastropoda
- Subclass: Caenogastropoda
- Order: Neogastropoda
- Superfamily: Conoidea
- Family: Clavatulidae
- Genus: Clavatula
- Species: C. asamusiensis

Binomial name
- Clavatula asamusiensis Nomura & Zinbo, 1940

Species of gastropod

Clavatula asamusiensis is a species of sea snail, a marine gastropod mollusk in the family Clavatulidae.

The Australian Faunal Directory considers this species a synonym of Paradrillia inconstans (E.A. Smith, 1875).

== Description ==
The shell grows to a length of 15 mm.

== Distribution ==
This species occurs in the Pacific Ocean off Japan and Queensland, Australia.
