= Diptychophlia hubrechti =

Scientific classification
- Kingdom: Animalia
- Phylum: Mollusca
- Class: Gastropoda
- Subclass: Caenogastropoda
- Order: Neogastropoda
- Superfamily: Conoidea
- Family: Borsoniidae
- Genus: Diptychophlia
- Species: D. hubrechti

Binomial name
- Diptychophlia hubrechti Cunha, 2005

Species of gastropod

Diptychophlia hubrechti is a species of sea snail, a marine gastropod mollusk in the family Borsoniidae.

== Distribution ==
This marine species occurs off in the Atlantic Ocean off Northeast Brazil.
