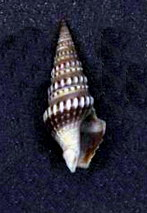
- Apertural view of a shell of Clavatula caerulea (museum specimen at Naturalis Biodiversity Center)

Scientific classification
- Kingdom: Animalia
- Phylum: Mollusca
- Class: Gastropoda
- Subclass: Caenogastropoda
- Order: Neogastropoda
- Superfamily: Conoidea
- Family: Clavatulidae
- Genus: Clavatula
- Species: C. caerulea

Binomial name
- Clavatula caerulea (Weinkauff & Kobelt, 1875)

Synonyms
- Drillia coerulea H.C. Weinkauff, 1875; Pleurotoma caerulea Weinkauff & Kobelt, 1875; Surcula coerulea Weinkauff; Surcula pyramidata Kiener

= Clavatula caerulea =

Species of gastropod

Clavatula caerulea is a species of sea snail, a marine gastropod mollusk in the family Clavatulidae.

== Description ==
The length of the shell attains 20 mm. The shell is narrowly turreted and strongly keeled. The keel is tuberculated, with revolving, sometimes granulous striae below it. The granules are more apparent at the base. The color of the shell is bluish, the tubercles white, with the interstices purplish.

== Distribution ==
This marine species occurs off Angola.
