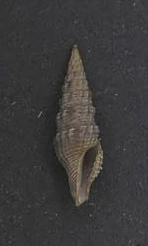
- Shell of Crassispira sinensis (museum specimen at Naturalis Biodiversity Center)

Scientific classification
- Kingdom: Animalia
- Phylum: Mollusca
- Class: Gastropoda
- Subclass: Caenogastropoda
- Order: Neogastropoda
- Superfamily: Conoidea
- Family: Pseudomelatomidae
- Genus: Crassispira
- Species: C. sinensis

Binomial name
- Crassispira sinensis (Hinds, 1843)

Synonyms
- Brachytoma sinensis (Hinds, 1843); Clavatula sinensis Hinds, 1843; Drillia sinensis (Hinds, 1843); Inquisitor sinensis (Hinds, 1843)

= Crassispira sinensis =

Species of gastropod

Crassispira sinensis is a species of sea snail, a marine gastropod mollusk in the family Pseudomelatomidae.

== Description ==
The shell contains numerous whorls, convex, slightly angulated and noduled on the periphery. They are flexuously longitudinally ribbed below and cancellated by raised revolving lines. The suture is bordered by an obliquely nodulous band. The color of the shell is yellowish or flesh-brown, sometimes narrowly dark-banded at the suture and base. The interior is yellowish.

== Distribution ==
This marine species occurs in the South China Sea and off New Guinea.
