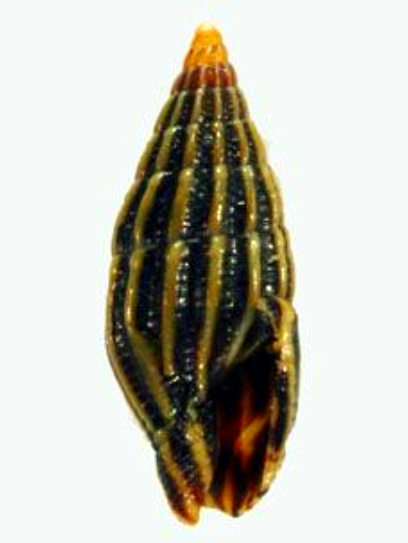
- Shell of Anachis pardalis (specimen at the Natural History Museum Rotterdam)

Scientific classification
- Kingdom: Animalia
- Phylum: Mollusca
- Class: Gastropoda
- Subclass: Caenogastropoda
- Order: Neogastropoda
- Family: Columbellidae
- Genus: Anachis
- Species: A. pardalis

Binomial name
- Anachis pardalis (Hinds, 1843)

Synonyms
- Anachis carmen Pilsbry & H. N. Lowe, 1932; Clavatula pardalis Hinds, 1843 (original combination); Crassispira pardalis (Hinds, 1844); Columbella sulcosa Sowerby, 1844

= Anachis pardalis =

Species of gastropod

Anachis pardalis is a species of sea snail, a marine gastropod mollusk in the family Columbellidae, the dove snails.

== Description ==
The length of the shell attains 8 mm.

(Original description in Latin) The shell is ovate, smooth, and blackish. It features tawny riblets that run from the apex to the base, and the interstices are striated. The aperture is oblong, with the outer lip crenulated inside, and the siphonal canal is short.

== Distribution ==
This species occurs in the Pacific Ocean from Costa Rica to Ecuador
