= Clavus fulvus =

Scientific classification
- Kingdom: Animalia
- Phylum: Mollusca
- Class: Gastropoda
- Subclass: Caenogastropoda
- Order: Neogastropoda
- Superfamily: Conoidea
- Family: Drilliidae
- Genus: Clavus
- Species: C. fulvus

Binomial name
- Clavus fulvus (Hinds, 1843)

Synonyms
- Clavatula fulva Hinds, 1843 (original combination); Clavus fulva (Hinds, 1843); Drillia fulva (Hinds, 1843)

Species of gastropod

Clavus fulvus is a species of sea snail, a marine gastropod mollusk in the family Drilliidae.

== Description ==
The size of an adult shell varies between 12 mm and 45 mm. The fulvous shell has six granulous, tubercularly ribbed whorls, that are angulated at the upper part. The suture shows a granulous line.

== Distribution ==
This species occurs in the demersal zone of the tropical Indo-Pacific off Réunion, the Philippines and Indonesia.
