= Crassispira coelata =

Scientific classification
- Kingdom: Animalia
- Phylum: Mollusca
- Class: Gastropoda
- Subclass: Caenogastropoda
- Order: Neogastropoda
- Superfamily: Conoidea
- Family: Pseudomelatomidae
- Genus: Crassispira
- Species: C. coelata

Binomial name
- Crassispira coelata (Hinds, 1843)

Synonyms
- Clavatula coelata Hinds, 1843; Crassispira (Dallspira) coelata (Hinds, 1843); Dallspira coelata (Hinds, 1843)

Species of gastropod

Crassispira coelata is a species of sea snail, a marine gastropod mollusk in the family Pseudomelatomidae.

== Distribution ==
This marine species occurs off Pacific Ocean Panama (Panama Canal Zone)
