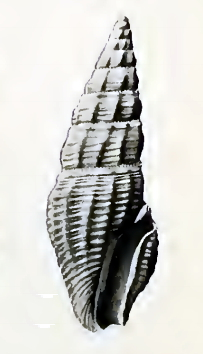
- Shell of Inquisitor spicata

Scientific classification
- Kingdom: Animalia
- Phylum: Mollusca
- Class: Gastropoda
- Subclass: Caenogastropoda
- Order: Neogastropoda
- Superfamily: Conoidea
- Family: Pseudomelatomidae
- Genus: Inquisitor
- Species: I. spicata

Binomial name
- Inquisitor spicata (Hinds, 1843)

Synonyms
- Clavatula spicata Hinds, 1843; Drillia hololeuca N.H. Odhner, 1917; Drillia spaldingi J.W. Brazier, 1876; Inquisitor fibratus Hedley, C. 1922; Inquisitor hololeucus (Odhner, 1917); Inquisitor spaldingi (Brazier, 1876)

= Inquisitor spicata =

Species of gastropod

Inquisitor spicata is a species of sea snail, a marine gastropod mollusk in the family Pseudomelatomidae.

== Description ==
The length of the shell attains 16 mm, its diameter 5.5 mm.

(Original description) The solid shell has a lanceolate shape and contains 10 whorls. Its colour is uniform dull white.

Sculpture :—Except where interrupted by the spirals, the shell is overrun by very close microscopic radial lamellae, a series of which rise along the suture and curl into arched scales. These crown the summit of each whorl and give a distinct recognition mark to the species. This crest of scales is underlined by a stout undulating cord. Though excavate out of the general contour, the fasciole is not well differentiated. It is sculptured by radial lamellae and traversed by two or three spiral threads. On the body whorl, anterior to the fasciole, run about sixteen rather flat-topped spiral lyrae, about twice their own breadth apart, between which one or two-minute interstitial threads may occur. On the penultimate whorl there are four such spirals .Wave-like ribs are set at about thirteen to a whorl, interrupted by the fasciole, but continuing to the base and ascending the spire perpendicularly.

Aperture :—The mouth is narrow. The siphonal canal is short and wide. The sinus is deeply U-shaped. The margin is everted. Behind the aperture is a varical swelling, followed by a narrow pocket groove, beyond which again the outer lip is turned inwards, giving rise to a short free edge. The callus on the columella is a thick sheet, the anterior edge of which is free from the preceding whorl.

== Distribution ==
This marine species is endemic to Australia and occurs off Northern Territory, Queensland and Western Australia.
