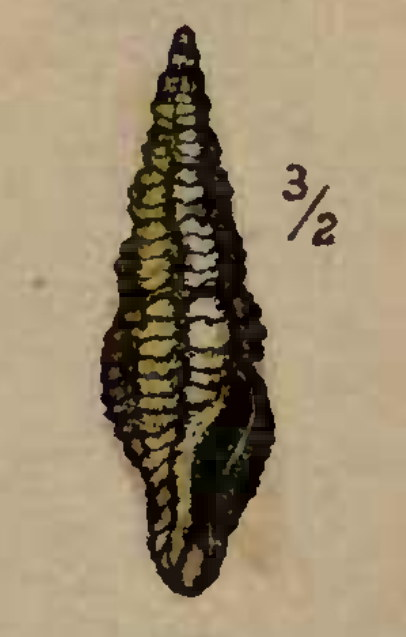
- Drawing of a shell of Diptychophlia occata

Scientific classification
- Kingdom: Animalia
- Phylum: Mollusca
- Class: Gastropoda
- Subclass: Caenogastropoda
- Order: Neogastropoda
- Superfamily: Conoidea
- Family: Borsoniidae
- Genus: Diptychophlia
- Species: D. occata

Binomial name
- Diptychophlia occata (Hinds, 1843)

Synonyms
- Clavatula occata Hinds, 1843

= Diptychophlia occata =

Species of gastropod

Diptychophlia occata is a species of sea snail, a marine gastropod mollusk in the family Borsoniidae.

== Description ==
The length of the shell attains 10 mm. The shell is light yellowish brown. The fusiform shell is slender and attenuated. The sculpture is angular from the ribs being continuous. The seven whorls are transversely ploughed. The suture is simple. The aperture is contracted, linear and a little oblique. The siphonal canal is of medium length.

== Distribution ==
This marine species occurs off Pacific Panama.
