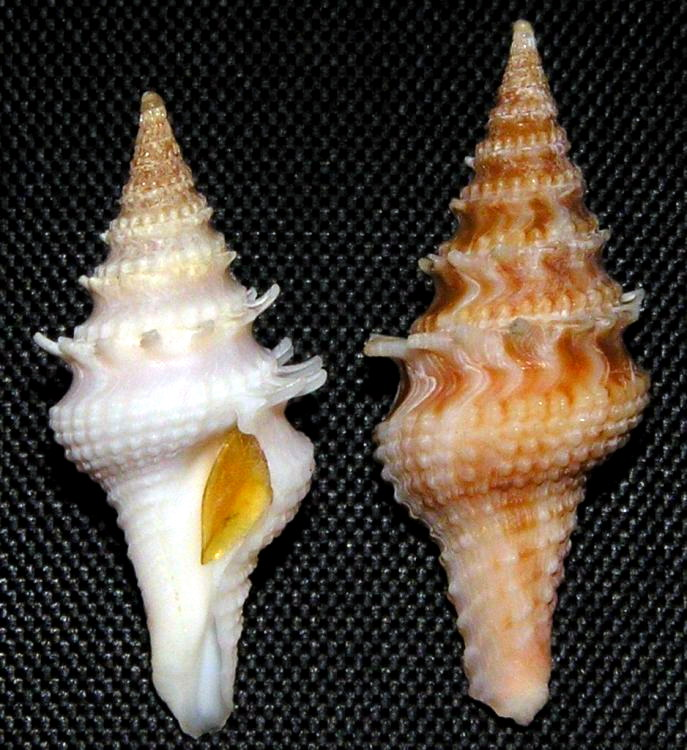
- Two views of a shell of Clavatula diadema

Scientific classification
- Kingdom: Animalia
- Phylum: Mollusca
- Class: Gastropoda
- Subclass: Caenogastropoda
- Order: Neogastropoda
- Superfamily: Conoidea
- Family: Clavatulidae
- Genus: Clavatula
- Species: C. diadema

Binomial name
- Clavatula diadema (Kiener, 1840)

Synonyms
- Pleurotoma diadema Kiener, 1840

= Clavatula diadema =

Species of gastropod

Clavatula diadema common name the diadem turrid, is a species of sea snail, a marine gastropod mollusk in the family Clavatulidae.

== Description ==
The size of an adult shell varies between 14 mm and 38 mm. Shells typically have the opening on the right side. The shape of top of the shell is a steep cone with small rigid protrusions circling each layer.

== Distribution ==
This species occurs in the Atlantic Ocean from Senegal to Angola.
