= Clavatula coronata =

Scientific classification
- Kingdom: Animalia
- Phylum: Mollusca
- Class: Gastropoda
- Subclass: Caenogastropoda
- Order: Neogastropoda
- Superfamily: Conoidea
- Family: Clavatulidae
- Genus: Clavatula
- Species: C. coronata

Binomial name
- Clavatula coronata Lamarck, 1801

Species of gastropod

Clavatula coronata is a species of sea snails, a marine gastropod mollusc in the family Clavatulidae.

== Distribution ==
This species occurs in the Atlantic Ocean off Benin and Togo.
