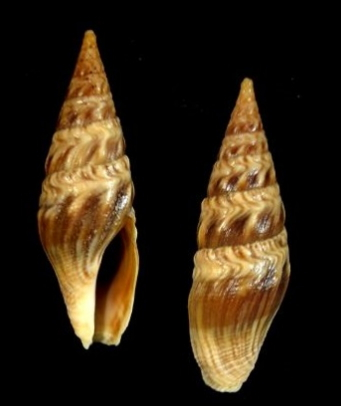
- Shell of Clavatula helena

Scientific classification
- Kingdom: Animalia
- Phylum: Mollusca
- Class: Gastropoda
- Subclass: Caenogastropoda
- Order: Neogastropoda
- Superfamily: Conoidea
- Family: Clavatulidae
- Genus: Clavatula
- Species: C. helena

Binomial name
- Clavatula helena Bartsch, 1915

= Clavatula helena =

Species of gastropod

Clavatula helena is a species of sea snail, a marine gastropod mollusk in the family Clavatulidae.

== Description ==
The size of an adult shell varies between 30 mm and 40 mm. The fusiform shell is moderately long. The ground color of the shell is yellow, superimposed with blotches and streaks of chestnut brown. The space between the sutures is brown in the anterior half. The teleoconch is flattened with a narrow keel posterior to the broad, anal sinus. The anterior half of the teleoconch has between 8 and 12 feeble axial ribs. All over the spire are very fine growth lines. The periphery of the body whorl is well rounded. The aperture is elongately oval. The thick outer lip is notched at the anal sinus. The parietal wall shows a very thick callus. The siphonal canal is very short.

== Distribution ==
This marine species occurs in Jeffrey's Bay - Tsitsikamma, South Africa
