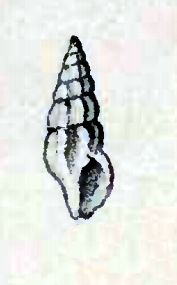
- Drawing of a shell of Pseudorhaphitoma pyramis

Scientific classification
- Domain: Eukaryota
- Kingdom: Animalia
- Phylum: Mollusca
- Class: Gastropoda
- Subclass: Caenogastropoda
- Order: Neogastropoda
- Superfamily: Conoidea
- Family: Mangeliidae
- Genus: Pseudorhaphitoma
- Species: P. pyramis

Binomial name
- Pseudorhaphitoma pyramis (Hinds, 1843)

Synonyms
- Clavatula pyramis Hinds, 1843 (original combination); Daphnella (Mangilia) obeliscus (Reeve, 1843); Mangelia obeliscus Reeve, L.A. 1846; Mangilia pyramis (Hinds, 1843); Pleurotoma pyramis (Hinds, 1843)

= Pseudorhaphitoma pyramis =

Species of gastropod

Pseudorhaphitoma pyramis is a small sea snail, a marine gastropod mollusk in the family Mangeliidae.

== Description ==
The length of the shell attains 12 mm.

The white shell is angularly longitudinally sharp ribbed, six-sided, with close revolving striae.

== Distribution ==
This marine species occurs off Korea, the Philippines, Indonesia and Queensland, Australia
