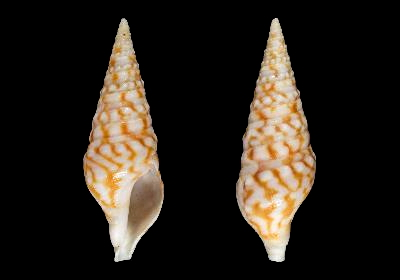
- Shell of Clavatula solangeae (holotype in the MNHN, Paris)

Scientific classification
- Kingdom: Animalia
- Phylum: Mollusca
- Class: Gastropoda
- Subclass: Caenogastropoda
- Order: Neogastropoda
- Superfamily: Conoidea
- Family: Clavatulidae
- Genus: Clavatula
- Species: C. solangeae

Binomial name
- Clavatula solangeae Bozzetti, 2006

= Clavatula solangeae =

Species of gastropod

Clavatula solangeae is a species of sea snail, a marine gastropod mollusk in the family Clavatulidae.

== Description ==
The size of an adult shell varies between 42 mm and 50 mm.

== Distribution ==
This species occurs in the Indian Ocean off Madagascar.
