= Clavatula ahuiri =

Scientific classification
- Kingdom: Animalia
- Phylum: Mollusca
- Class: Gastropoda
- Subclass: Caenogastropoda
- Order: Neogastropoda
- Superfamily: Conoidea
- Family: Clavatulidae
- Genus: Clavatula
- Species: C. ahuiri

Binomial name
- Clavatula ahuiri Cossignani & Ardovini, 2014

Species of gastropod

Clavatula ahuiri is a species of sea snails, a marine gastropod mollusc in the family Clavatulidae.

== Distribution ==
This species occurs in the Atlantic Ocean off Morocco
