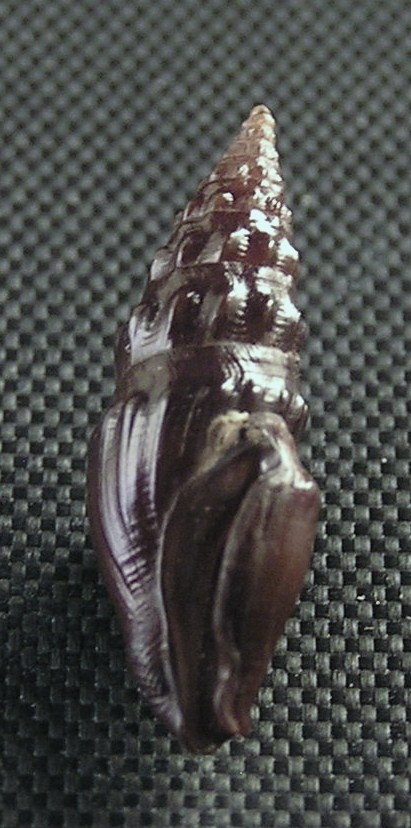
- Apertural view of a shell of Crassispira kluthi

Scientific classification
- Kingdom: Animalia
- Phylum: Mollusca
- Class: Gastropoda
- Subclass: Caenogastropoda
- Order: Neogastropoda
- Superfamily: Conoidea
- Family: Pseudomelatomidae
- Genus: Crassispira
- Species: C. kluthi

Binomial name
- Crassispira kluthi Jordan, 1936

Synonyms
- Crassispira cubensis Smith, 1882; Crassispira luctuosa Hinds, 1843; Crassispira palliata Reeve, 1845; Crassispira (Striospira) kluthi Jordan, 1936; Crassispira (Striospira) tabogaensis Bartsch, 1931; Drillia luctuosa Hinds, 1843; Pleurotoma (Crassispira) cubensis Smith, E.A., 1882; Pleurotoma luctuosa Reeve, 1845 non Pleurotoma luctuosa d'Orbigny 1847; Pleurotoma palliata Reeve, L.A., 1845; Striospira lucasensis Bartsch, 1950

= Crassispira kluthi =

Species of gastropod

Crassispira kluthi is a species of sea snail, a marine gastropod mollusk in the family Pseudomelatomidae.

== Description ==
The length of the shell varies between 10 mm and 20 mm.

This unpretending little species is easily recognized by its black colour and faint sculpture. A row of small tubercles ascends the spire, scarcely discernible on the last whorl, which (as in Crassispira rudis) descends and rises again at the aperture, making the spire-outlines curvilinear. The first three whorls are smooth. The surface shows extremely fine lines of growth, faintly decussated by spiral striae. The outer lip is sharp, not serrated, with a swelling behind. The anterior sinus is very distinct, as in Strombus. The posterior notch is deep. The sutural callosity is large, joining the well-developed inner lip. The operculum is shaped as in Drillia maculosa, with more or less of a reddish tinge. The spire is generally incrusted with blackish mud, sometimes bearing round flat egg-cases, pierced in the middle.

== Distribution ==
This species occurs in the Pacific Ocean off Panama; fossils were found in Pleistocene strata of the Gulf of California.
