= Makiyamaia decorata =

Scientific classification
- Kingdom: Animalia
- Phylum: Mollusca
- Class: Gastropoda
- Subclass: Caenogastropoda
- Order: Neogastropoda
- Superfamily: Conoidea
- Family: Clavatulidae
- Genus: Makiyamaia
- Species: M. decorata

Binomial name
- Makiyamaia decorata Oleinik 1991

Extinct species of gastropod

Makiyamaia decorata is an extinct species of sea snail, a marine gastropod mollusc in the family Clavatulidae.

== Distribution ==
Fossils of this species were found in Eocene deposits in the Lower Snatolskaya Formation, Russia (age range 48.6 to 37.2 Ma).
