= Paraclavatula christianae =

Scientific classification
- Kingdom: Animalia
- Phylum: Mollusca
- Class: Gastropoda
- Subclass: Caenogastropoda
- Order: Neogastropoda
- Superfamily: Conoidea
- Family: Clavatulidae
- Genus: Paraclavatula
- Species: P. christianae

Binomial name
- Paraclavatula christianae (Nolf, 2011)

Synonyms
- Clavatula christianae Nolf, 2011 (original combination)

Species of gastropod

Paraclavatula christianae is a species of sea snail, a marine gastropod mollusk in the family Clavatulidae.

== Distribution ==
This marine species occurs in the Atlantic Ocean off West Africa.
