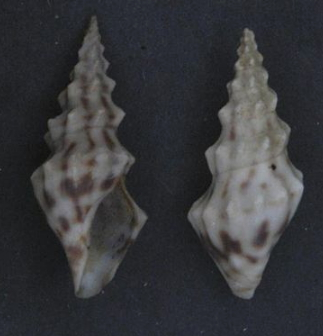
- Two views of a shell of Clavus flammulatus (museum specimens at Naturalis Biodiversity Center)

Scientific classification
- Kingdom: Animalia
- Phylum: Mollusca
- Class: Gastropoda
- Subclass: Caenogastropoda
- Order: Neogastropoda
- Superfamily: Conoidea
- Family: Drilliidae
- Genus: Clavus
- Species: C. flammulatus

Binomial name
- Clavus flammulatus Montfort, 1810

Synonyms
- Clavatula echinata Lamarck, 1816; Drillia echinata Lamarck, 1816

= Clavus flammulatus =

Species of gastropod

Clavus flammulatus, common name the flame turrid, is a species of sea snail, a marine gastropod mollusk in the family Drilliidae.

== Description ==
The size of an adult shell varies between 25 mm and 50 mm. The shell is whitish, with chestnut longitudinal streaks, forming bands interrupted by the ribs, often chestnut-spotted between the tubercles.

== Distribution ==
This species occurs in the Indian Ocean off East Africa and in the Central Pacific Ocean; also off Australia (Western Australia).
