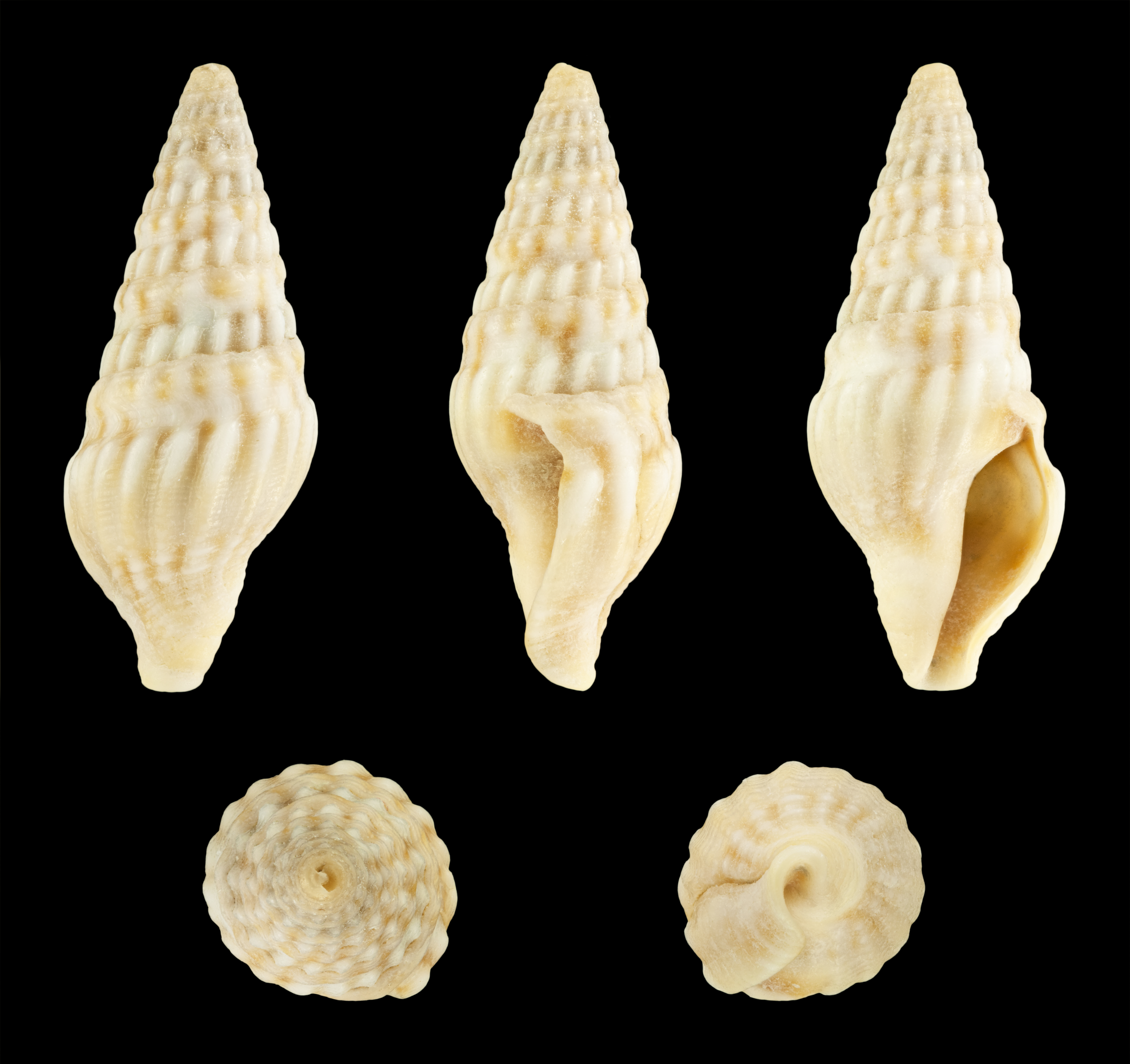
- Shell of Paraclavatula delphinae

Scientific classification
- Kingdom: Animalia
- Phylum: Mollusca
- Class: Gastropoda
- Subclass: Caenogastropoda
- Order: Neogastropoda
- Superfamily: Conoidea
- Family: Clavatulidae
- Genus: Paraclavatula
- Species: P. delphinae

Binomial name
- Paraclavatula delphinae (Nolf, 2008)

Synonyms
- Clavatula delphinae Nolf, 2008 (original combination)

= Paraclavatula delphinae =

Species of gastropod

Paraclavatula delphinae is a species of sea snail, a marine gastropod mollusk in the family Clavatulidae. It is the type species of the genus Paraclavatula, which was established by Kantor, Horro, Rolán & Puillandre in 2018.

== Description ==
The size of an adult shell varies between 10 mm and 35 mm. The species possesses a radula with five teeth in a transverse row, a configuration described as unique within Clavatulidae and found elsewhere in Conoidea only in the family Drilliidae. The marginal teeth are duplex, with a sharp-edged major limb and a vestigial minor limb approximately one-third the length of the major limb. The lateral teeth are irregularly shaped and plate-like, and the central teeth are heart-shaped in dorsal view with a notched anterior margin.

== Distribution ==
This species occurs in the Atlantic Ocean between Ghana and Democratic Republic of the Congo. The holotype is deposited at the Royal Belgian Institute of Natural Sciences (RBINS). The type locality is Plage Koraf, Pointe-Noire, at the mouth of the Songolo River, Republic of the Congo, at a depth of 4 m. The species inhabits shallow water, from low tide to 10 m depth, and is typically found in sandy mud or under rocks and in rock crevices.
