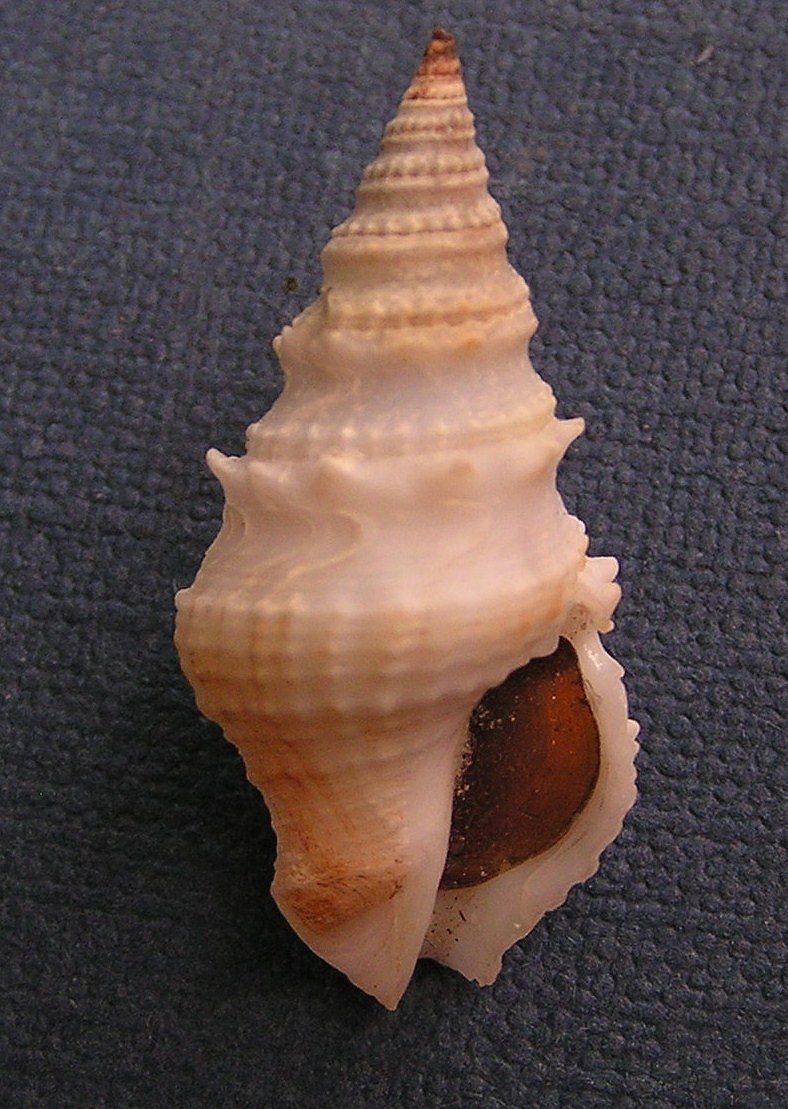
- Apertural view of Clavatula muricata

Scientific classification
- Kingdom: Animalia
- Phylum: Mollusca
- Class: Gastropoda
- Subclass: Caenogastropoda
- Order: Neogastropoda
- Superfamily: Conoidea
- Family: Clavatulidae
- Genus: Clavatula
- Species: C. muricata

Binomial name
- Clavatula muricata (Lamarck, 1822)

Synonyms
- Pleurotoma mitra Wood, W., 1828; Pleurotoma muricata Lamarck, 1822; Pleurotoma virginea Reeve, L.A., 1843

= Clavatula muricata =

Species of gastropod

Clavatula muricata, common name the muricate turrid, is a species of sea snail, a marine gastropod mollusk in the family Clavatulidae.

== Description ==
The size of an adult shell varies between 20 mm and 45 mm. The upper portion of the whorls are smooth and concave, with a sutural band of tubercles, sometimes becoming spinose. The periphery of the shell is angulated, and tuberculate, as well as the body whorl below it. This is caused by rude curved longitudinal ribs crossed by the revolving sculpture. The color of the shell is light yellowish brown, sometimes fasciated. The aperture is occasionally light violaceous, but mostly white. This species varies much in form and in the degree of development of the tubercles and spines.

== Distribution ==
This species occurs in the Atlantic Ocean off São Tomé and Príncipe and from Senegal to Gabon;
