= Paraclavatula pseudomystica =

Scientific classification
- Kingdom: Animalia
- Phylum: Mollusca
- Class: Gastropoda
- Subclass: Caenogastropoda
- Order: Neogastropoda
- Superfamily: Conoidea
- Family: Clavatulidae
- Genus: Paraclavatula
- Species: P. pseudomystica

Binomial name
- Paraclavatula pseudomystica (Nolf, 2008)

Synonyms
- Clavatula pseudomystica Nolf, 2008 (original combination)

Species of gastropod

Paraclavatula pseudomystica is a species of sea snail, a marine gastropod mollusk in the family Clavatulidae.

== Description ==
The size of an adult shell varies between 17 mm and 28 mm.

== Distribution ==
This species occurs in the Atlantic Ocean off Angola and Democratic Republic of Congo.
