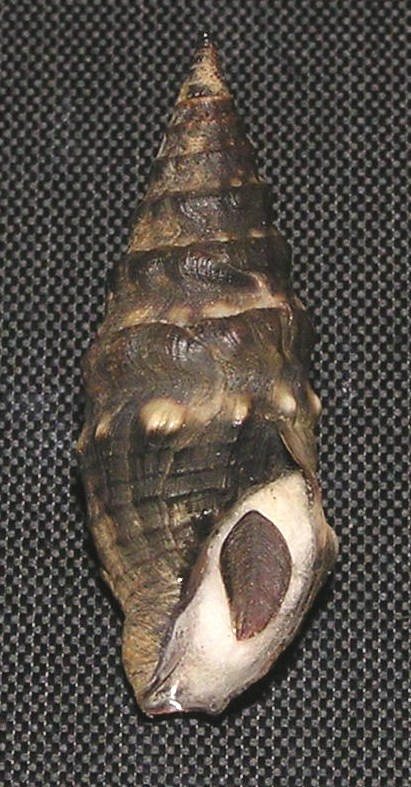
- Apertural view of a shell of Crassispira rudis

Scientific classification
- Kingdom: Animalia
- Phylum: Mollusca
- Class: Gastropoda
- Subclass: Caenogastropoda
- Order: Neogastropoda
- Superfamily: Conoidea
- Family: Pseudomelatomidae
- Genus: Crassispira
- Species: C. rudis

Binomial name
- Crassispira rudis (Sowerby I, 1834)

Synonyms
- Crassispira albovallosa Carpenter, P.P., 1856; Drillia rudis (G.B. Sowerby I, 1834); Pleurotoma rudis Sowerby I, 1834 (original combination)

= Crassispira rudis =

Species of gastropod

Crassispira rudis, common name the rustic pleurotoma, is a species of sea snail, a marine gastropod mollusk in the family Pseudomelatomidae.

== Description ==
The length of the shell varies between 11 mm and 28 mm.

(Original description) The thick, turreted shell is very dark brown, almost black. The whorls are contracted in the middle, tuberculated above and below, each of the lower tubercles having a white spot above it. The body whorl is rather out of the centre. The siphonal canal is short. The outer lip is thin, sinuous, armed above the sinus with a strong callosity

== Distribution ==
This marine species occurs between the Sea of Cortez, Western Mexico and Ecuador
