= Richard Brinsley Hinds =

English botanist

Richard Brinsley Hinds FRCS
- Born: 11 October 1811; Aldermaston, England
- Died: 25 May 1846 (aged 34); Swan River, Western Australia
- Occupations: Naval surgeon, botanist, malacologist
- Notable work: The Botany of the Voyage of H.M.S. Sulphur (1844); The Zoology of the Voyage of H.M.S. Sulphur (1844)

Richard Brinsley Hinds FRCS (11 October 1811, in Aldermaston, England – 25 May 1846, in Swan River, Western Australia) was a British naval surgeon, botanist and malacologist. He sailed on the 1835–42 voyage by HMS Sulphur to explore the Pacific Ocean, and edited the natural history reports of that expedition.

== Biography ==
Hinds was born at Aldermaston on 11 October 1811, the eldest child of Richard Hinds, a surgeon in the Royal Navy, and his wife, Susannah (née Ridley). In 1829, he began studying at St Bartholomew's Hospital. In 1830, he matriculated at London University, where he gained an honours degree. He is reported to have been awarded the Gold Medal of the Worshipful Society of Apothecaries for botany, but no record of that seems to have survived. In 1833, he was accepted as a Member of the Royal College of Surgeons.

On 28 February 1835, he joined the Royal Navy with the rank of Assistant Surgeon, and was appointed to the Royal Naval Hospital, Haslar. On 26 September 1835, he was appointed surgeon in HMS Sulphur. That ship was to be employed as a hydrographic surveying vessel in the Pacific Ocean, and her officers were chosen for their scientific abilities, particularly in natural history. On 24 December 1835, she sailed from Plymouth, to circumnavigate the globe in the westerly direction; on 19 July 1842, she arrived again in England, at Spithead. Hinds was invalided home on 30 April 1841. On 29 November 1841 he married Martha Emma McCallum at East Stonehouse.

On 6 August 1842, he was appointed to HMY William & Mary, with the duty of organising the natural history specimens acquired during Sulphur's voyage. During January – February 1841, he had collected plants at Hong Kong; the first such collection to be brought to England. In 1842, he published a paper entitled "Remarks on the Physical Aspect, Climate and Vegetation of Hong Kong, China" in Sir William Hooker's London Journal of Botany. It was accompanied by a paper by the botanist George Bentham identifying, and in some cases describing, almost 140 species of plant. He published many articles in Hooker's Annals of Natural History. On 31 January 1843, he was promoted Surgeon. In 1843, Captain Edward Belcher, commander of Sulphur, published a two-volume report entitled Narrative of a Voyage Round the World. It included a contribution by Hinds, published separately in 1843 under the title The Regions of Vegetation, Being an Analysis of the Distribution of Vegetable Forms over the Surface of the Globe in Connection with Climate and Physical Agents. He was appointed by the Lords Commissioners of the Admiralty to help prepare reports on the natural history of Sulphur's voyage – towards the expense of which they contributed £500. Those reports were published in 1844 under his editorship as The Botany of the Voyage of H.M.S. Sulphur and The Zoology of the Voyage of H.M.S. Sulphur. Two of the three volumes have no named author, and he may have written them. In 1844, he was nominated (by Sir William Barnett, Director-General of Naval Hospitals and Fleets) to be, and was elected as, Fellow of the Royal College of Surgeons, as a representative for the Royal Navy.

His health had been affected by fever suffered during naval service. On 23 January 1845, he received permission to go to Australia; on 31 January 1845, he was discharged from William & Mary; and on 19 May 1845, he was placed on the unfit list with a diagnosis of "phthisis" (possibly tuberculosis, possibly some other disease). He emigrated to Swan River, Western Australia; where on 25 May 1846 he died, at the age of 34.

During her voyage of 1835–42, Sulphur had continued earlier hydrographic and natural history surveys of the Pacific Ocean by the Royal Navy; notably that of 1831–36 by HMS Beagle, in which Charles Darwin had sailed as naturalist and Captain's companion. A letter of 21 April 1843 from Hinds to Darwin survives. Darwin's annotated copy of Hinds' The Regions of Vegetation, etc. is preserved in Cambridge University Library.

== Taxa described ==
The standard author abbreviation Hinds is used to indicate this person as the author when citing a botanical name.

Hinds described many marine animal species including 346 marine species (as listed in the World Register of Marine Species) (many of which have become synonyms), including:

- Columbella carinata, a synonym of Alia carinata ("carinate dove shell"), a small marine gastropod mollusc in the family Columbellidae

== Taxa named in honour ==
The following genera and species were named in honour of Hinds:

- Carex hindsii, junior synonym of Carex lenticularis
- Hindsia, a plant genus of South America in family Rubiaceae
- Quercus hindsiana and Quercus hindsii, junior synonyms of Quercus lobata

The World Register of Marine Species lists 25 marine species with the epithet "hindsii".

== See also ==
- Category:Taxa named by Richard Brinsley Hinds
