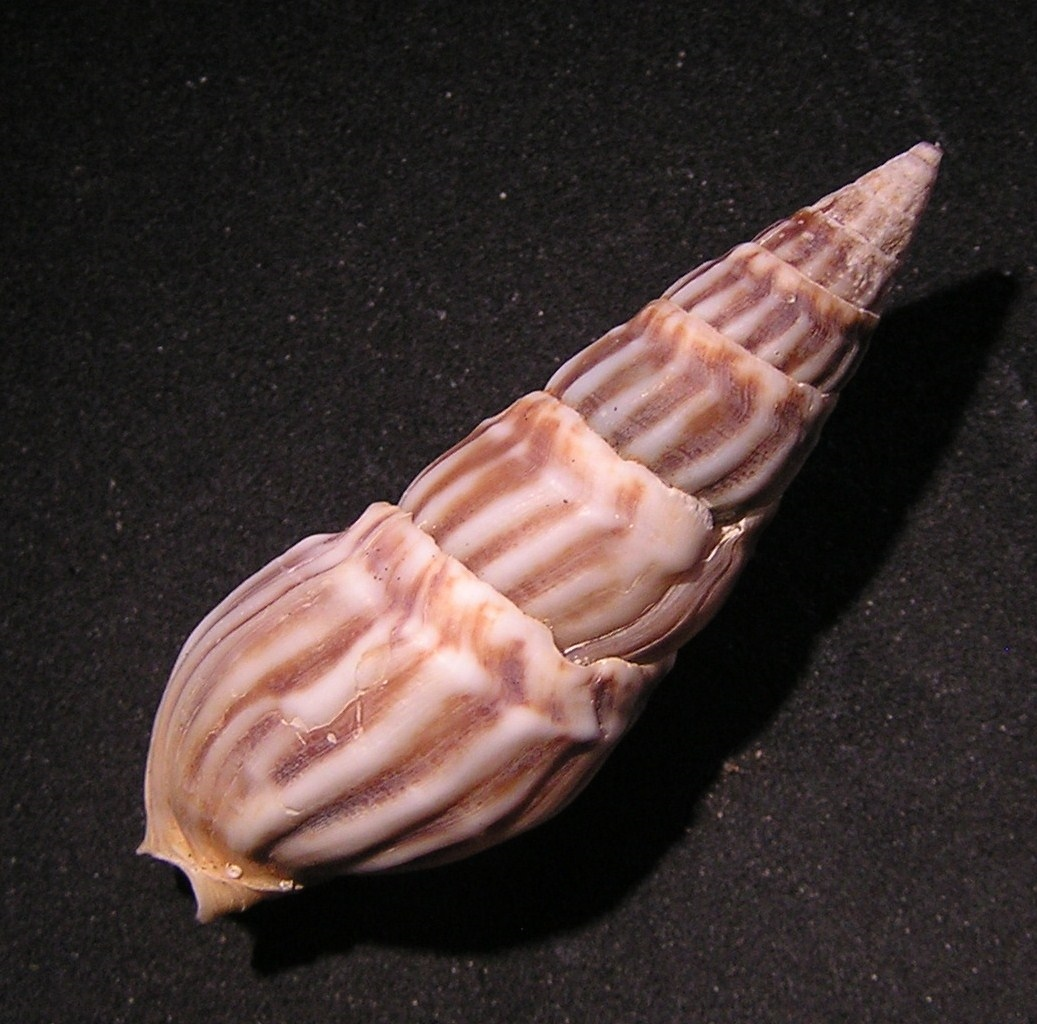
- Clionella sinuata

Scientific classification
- Kingdom: Animalia
- Phylum: Mollusca
- Class: Gastropoda
- Subclass: Caenogastropoda
- Order: Neogastropoda
- Superfamily: Conoidea
- Family: Clavatulidae
- Genus: Clionella; Gray, 1847

Type species
- Buccinum sinuatum Born, 1778 Born, 1778

Synonyms
- Melatoma Swainson, 1840

= Clionella =

Genus of gastropods

Clionella is a genus of sea snails, marine gastropod mollusks in the family Clavatulidae.

== Description ==
The shell of the species in this genus is narrowly bucciniform and turriculated. The protoconch is somewhat conical, containing 2 whorls. The whorls are somewhat flattened, longitudinally ribbed with long, flexuous ribs, and have a thick epidermis. The ribs lack subsutural or peripheral processes. The spire of the shell is elevated. The body whorl is truncated. The siphonal canal is scarcely indicated at the broad base of the aperture. The anal sinus is very shallow. The lip has a small infrasutural anal sinus with no distinct parietal tubercle. The operculum has a lateral nucleus. The foot is short, broad, and rounded behind. The eyes are located near the tip of the tentacles. Radula formula (1–1–1),

== Distribution ==
This marine genus mainly occurs off South Africa.

== Species ==
Species within the genus Clionella include:

- Clionella aglaophanes (Watson, 1882)
- Clionella bornii (E.A. Smith, 1877)
- Clionella confusa Smith E. A., 1906
- Clionella costata (Swainson, 1840)
- Clionella halistrepta (Bartsch, 1915)
- Clionella kraussii (E.A. Smith, 1877)
- Clionella liltvedi Kilburn, 1985
- Clionella lobatopsis (Barnard, 1963)
- Clionella rosaria (Reeve, 1846)
- Clionella semicostata (Kiener, 1840)
- Clionella sinuata (Born, 1778)
- Clionella striolata Turton, 1932
- Clionella subcontracta (E.A. Smith, 1904)
- Clionella subventricosa (E.A. Smith, 1877)
- Clionella vilma (Thiele, 1925)

Species brought into synonymy

- Clionella amblia R.B. Watson, 1882: synonym of Inodrillia nucleata (Dall, 1881)
- Clionella assimilans Turton, 1932; synonym of Clavatula tripartita (Weinkauff, 1876)
- Clionella bipartita E.A. Smith, 1877: synonym of Clavatula tripartita (Weinkauff, H.C. & W. Kobelt, 1876)
- Clionella conspicienda Locard, 1897: synonym of Belomitra quadruplex (Watson, 1882)
- Clionella delicatulina Locard, 1897: synonym of Belomitra quadruplex (Watson, 1882)
- Clionella elizabethae Bartsch, P., 1915: synonym of Nquma rousi (Sowerby III, 1886)
- Clionella gravis (Hinds, 1843): synonym of Makiyamaia gravis (Hinds, 1843)
- Clionella kowiensis Turton, 1932: synonym of Clionella rosaria (Reeve, 1846)
- Clionella kowiensis viridis Turton, 1932: synonym of Clionella kowiensis Turton, 1932, synonym of Clionella rosaria (Reeve, 1846)
- Clionella krausii (E. A. Smith, 1877): synonym of Clionella kraussii (E.A. Smith, 1877)
- Clionella nereia Bartsch, 1915: synonym of Clionella rosaria (Reeve, 1846)
- Clionella proxima Turton, 1932: synonym of Clionella rosaria (Reeve, 1846)
- Clionella quadruplex (Watson, 1882) : synonym of Belomitra quadruplex (Watson, 1882)
- Clionella sinuatum (Born, 1778): synonym of Clionella sinuata (Born, 1778)
- Clionella sybaritica Bartsch, 1915: synonym of Clionella rosaria (Reeve, 1846)
- Clionella taxea (Röding, 1798): synonym of Clavatula taxea (Röding, 1798)
- Clionella tripartita (Weinkauff & Kobelt, 1876): synonym of Clavatula tripartita (Weinkauff, 1876)
