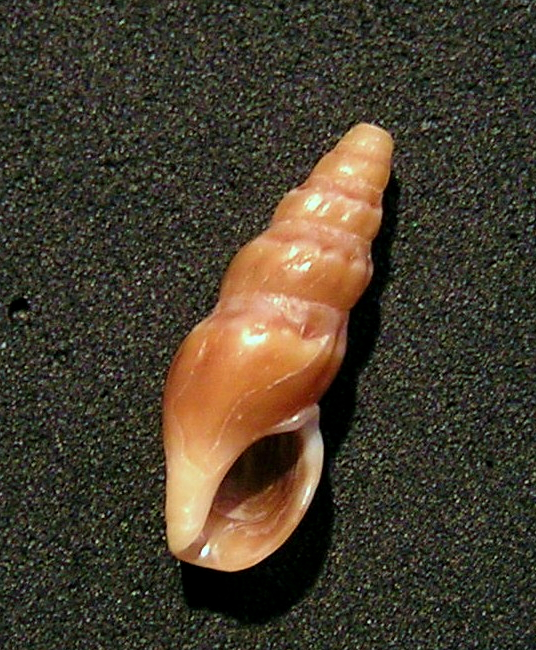
- Crassiclava layardi

Scientific classification
- Kingdom: Animalia
- Phylum: Mollusca
- Class: Gastropoda
- Subclass: Caenogastropoda
- Order: Neogastropoda
- Superfamily: Conoidea
- Family: Pseudomelatomidae
- Genus: Crassiclava; McLean, 1971

Type species
- Pleurotoma turricula G. B. Sowerby I, 1834

Species
- See text

= Crassiclava =

Genus of gastropods

Crassiclava is a genus of sea snails, marine gastropod mollusks in the family Pseudomelatomidae.

== Species ==
Species within the genus Crassiclava include:

- Crassiclava balteata Kilburn, 1988
- Crassiclava layardi (Sowerby III, 1897)
- Crassiclava omia (Barnard, 1958)

Species brought into synonymy

- Crassiclava apicata Reeve, 1845: synonym of Crassispira apicata (Reeve, 1845)
- Crassiclava halistrepta (Bartsch, 1915): synonym of Clionella halistrepta (Bartsch, 1915)
