= Belomitra viridis =

Scientific classification
- Kingdom: Animalia
- Phylum: Mollusca
- Class: Gastropoda
- Subclass: Caenogastropoda
- Order: Neogastropoda
- Family: Belomitridae
- Genus: Belomitra
- Species: B. viridis

Binomial name
- Belomitra viridis (Okutani, 1966)

Synonyms
- Pontiothauma viridis (Okutani, 1966); Speoides viridis Okutani, 1966 (original combination)

Species of gastropod

Belomitra viridis is a species of sea snail, a marine gastropod mollusc in the family Belomitridae.
