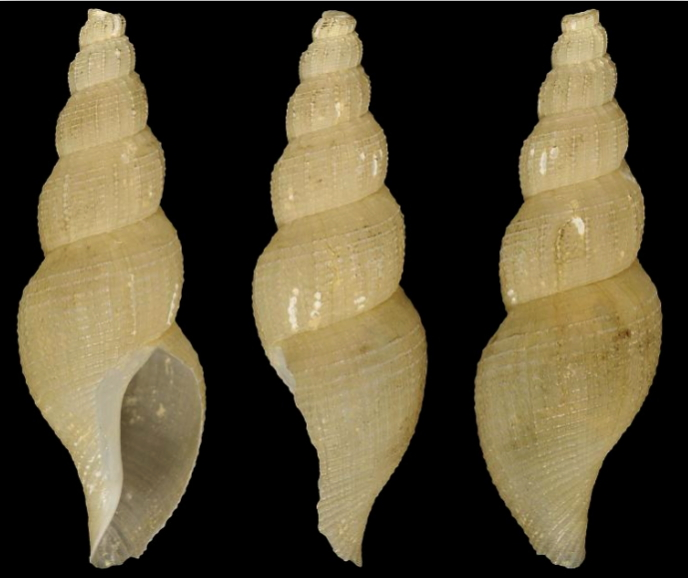
- Shell of Belomitra pacifica (holotype at the Smithsonian Institution)

Scientific classification
- Kingdom: Animalia
- Phylum: Mollusca
- Class: Gastropoda
- Subclass: Caenogastropoda
- Order: Neogastropoda
- Family: Belomitridae
- Genus: Belomitra
- Species: B. pacifica

Binomial name
- Belomitra pacifica (Dall, 1908)

Synonyms
- Leucosyrinx pacifica Dall, 1908 (original combination); Morrisonella pacifica (Dall, 1908)

= Belomitra pacifica =

Species of gastropod

Belomitra pacifica is a species of sea snail, a marine gastropod mollusc in the family Belomitridae.

== Description ==
The length of the (decollate) shell is 23 mm, its diameter 7 mm.

(Original description) The small, delicate shell is white with a pale yellowish periostracum. It contains at least six whorls beside the (lost) protoconch. The spire is acute, slender and is longer than the aperture. The suture is deep and appressed. The whorls are gently rounded. The apical whorls show (on the third whorl about fifteen) very narrow, sharp, threadlike, vertical ribs with much wider interspaces, and at the suture numerous, irregular, small, retractive folds extending over the fasciole, with wider interspaces, nearly twice as many as there are ribs. On the succeeding whorls these ribs and folds grow sparser and weaker, so that on the sixth whorl ribs, folds and fasciole are obsolete or absent.

On the spire, the axial sculpture is crossed by (on the third whorl about eight, on the sixth ten or a dozen) fine flat threads with wider interspaces, (increasing by interpolation), which override the ribs and rise above them but do not form nodules at the intersections. These spirals are very uniform and on the body whorl extend forward covering the siphonal canal, and are slightly scored by the incremental lines. The aperture is oval, not mature in the specimen. The anal sulcus is obsolete. The columella and the body are polished, the surface erased, not callous. The columella is short, gyrate, the axis pervious, but the siphonal canal is short, rather wide, with no siphonal fasciole. The outer lip is only slightly produced, sharp and thin in the type specimen. The operculum is concentric, pointed in front, with an apical nucleus.

== Distribution ==
This marine species occurs off the Alexander Archipelago, Prince Of Wales Island, West of Alaska, United States, North Pacific Ocean at a depths of 2869 m.
