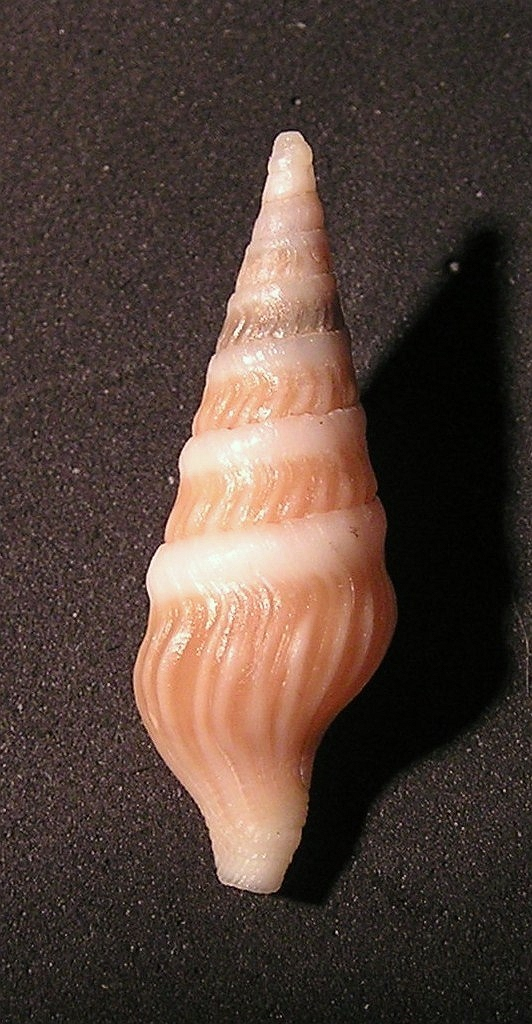
- Toxiclionella haliplex

Scientific classification
- Kingdom: Animalia
- Phylum: Mollusca
- Class: Gastropoda
- Subclass: Caenogastropoda
- Order: Neogastropoda
- Superfamily: Conoidea
- Family: Clavatulidae
- Genus: Toxiclionella; Powell, 1966

Type species
- Clavatula tumida G.B. Sowerby II, 1870

Synonyms
- Clionella (Toxiclionella) Powell, 1966; Toxiclionella (Toxiclionella) Powell, 1966

= Toxiclionella =

Genus of gastropods

Toxiclionella is a genus of sea snails, marine gastropod mollusks in the family Clavatulidae. The genus is known for having hypodermic marginal teeth. All three species are endemic to the waters of South Africa.

== Description ==
Members of Toxiclionella have a shell ranging between 55–60 mm (2.2–2.4 in) in size, and are claviform, with a tall spire of flattened outlines and a narrow body-whorl which terminates in a short anterior canal. Members of the species can be distinguished due to having toxoglossate radula consisting of a bundle of long, curved marginals, which are double-barbed near the tip of the shell.

Toxiclionella are known for having hypodermic marginal teeth which are loosely enrolled and attached to the radular ribbon along their length.

== Taxonomy ==
The taxon was first described as a subgenus of Clionella in 1966 by New Zealand malacologist Baden Powell, who assigned Toxiclionella tumida, which has originally been described as Clavatula tumida by George Brettingham Sowerby II in 1870, as the type species. Powell split off the members of the genus from Clionella due to the toxoglossate dentition in the radula found in the species. By 1985, malacologist Richard Kilburn had begun referring to Toxiclionella as a full genus.

== Distribution and habitat ==
Toxiclionella is endemic to the waters of South Africa, found in the photic zone between depths of 45–100 m (148–328 ft). T. impages and T. tumida are both found on the Agulhas Bank, while T. haliplex is found off the coast of Eastern Cape.

== Species ==
Species within the genus Toxiclionella include:

- Toxiclionella haliplex (Bartsch, 1915)
- Toxiclionella impages (Adams & Reeve, 1848)
- Toxiclionella tumida (Sowerby II, 1870)

Species brought into synonymy

- Toxiclionella elstoni (Barnard, 1962): synonym of Caliendrula elstoni (Barnard, 1962)

== Gallery ==
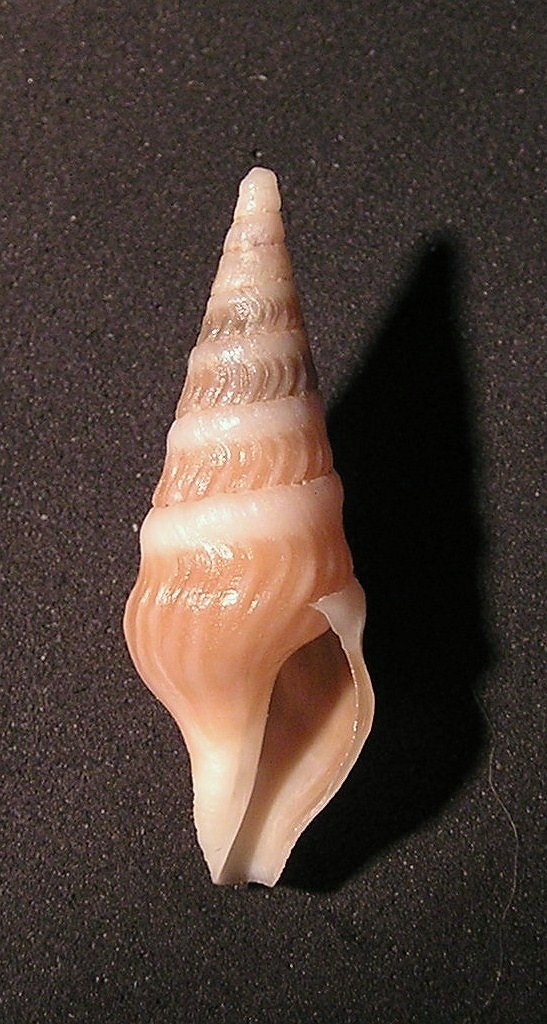
Toxiclionella haliplex

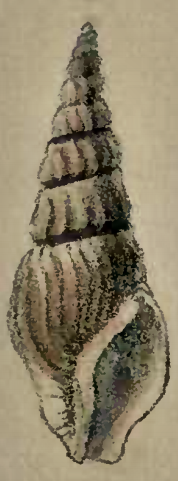
Illustration of Toxiclionella impages by George Washington Tryon from the Manual of Conchology (1848)

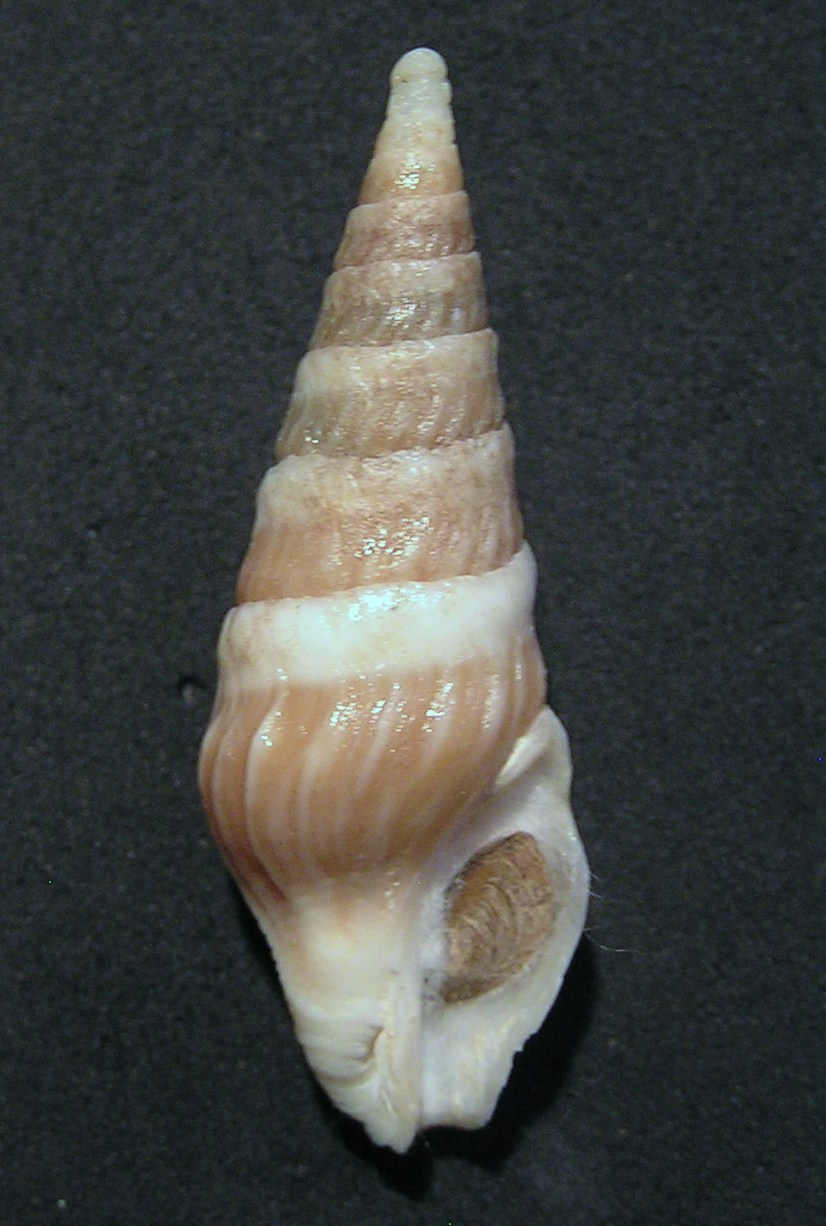
Toxiclionella impages
