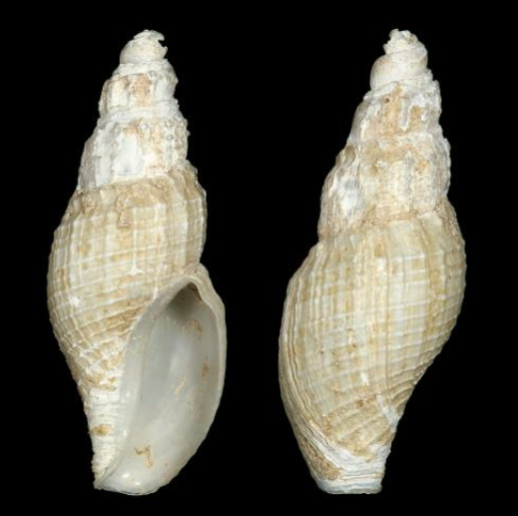
- Shell of Belomitra climacella (lectotype at the Smithsonian Institution)

Scientific classification
- Kingdom: Animalia
- Phylum: Mollusca
- Class: Gastropoda
- Subclass: Caenogastropoda
- Order: Neogastropoda
- Family: Belomitridae
- Genus: Belomitra
- Species: B. climacella

Binomial name
- Belomitra climacella (Dall, 1895)

Synonyms
- Antizafra aoteana Dell, 1956; Dellina aoteana (Dell, 1956); Pleurotomella climacella Dall, 1895; Waipaoa aoteana (Dell, 1956); Waipaoa munida Ponder, 1968

= Belomitra climacella =

Species of gastropod

Belomitra climacella is a species of sea snail, a marine gastropod mollusc in the family Belomitridae. It is only known from the original type lot collected in 1891 off the Hawaiian islands. Conchologically, it is quite distinct from other known tropical Indo-Pacific Belomitra. It does, however, strongly resemble the Belomitra aoteana, found in New Zealand.

== Distribution ==
This marine species occurs off New Zealand and off Oahu Island, Hawaii at a depth of 642 m.
