= Inodrillia acrybia =

Scientific classification
- Kingdom: Animalia
- Phylum: Mollusca
- Class: Gastropoda
- Subclass: Caenogastropoda
- Order: Neogastropoda
- Superfamily: Conoidea
- Family: Horaiclavidae
- Genus: Inodrillia
- Species: I. acrybia

Binomial name
- Inodrillia acrybia (W.H. Dall, 1889)

Synonyms
- Drillia acrybia Dall, 1889 (original combination)

Species of gastropod

Inodrillia acrybia is a species of sea snail, a marine gastropod mollusk in the family Horaiclavidae.

== Description ==
The shell grows to a length of 10 mm.

(Original description) The shell is closely related to Inodrillia pharcida with which it may advantageously be compared. The most obvious differences are, that in I. pharcida the ribs and their intersecting sharp spirals are as strong on the body whorl as on the others, in Inodrillia acrybia the ribs on the last whorl are obsolete and the spirals fainter. The spire of I. acrybia is shorter in proportion to the body whorl, the siphonal canal is longer, there is one less whorl in the adult shell, the fasciole is less excavated, the suture more appressed, and consequently less evident. In all other respects the shells closely resemble one another.

== Distribution ==
This species occurs in the demersal zone of the Atlantic Ocean off Georgia to Eastern Florida at depths between 250 m (136 fathoms) and 537 m (294 fathoms).
