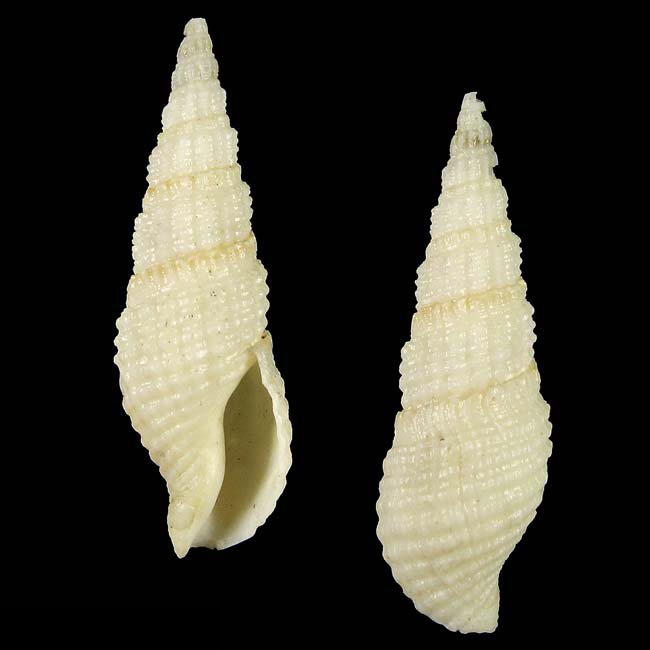

Scientific classification
- Kingdom: Animalia
- Phylum: Mollusca
- Class: Gastropoda
- Subclass: Caenogastropoda
- Order: Neogastropoda
- Family: Belomitridae
- Genus: Belomitra
- Species: B. leobrerorum

Binomial name
- Belomitra leobrerorum Poppe & Tagaro, 2010

= Belomitra leobrerorum =

Species of gastropod

Belomitra leobrerorum is a species of sea snail, a marine gastropod mollusc in the family Belomitridae.

== Original description ==
- Poppe G. & Tagaro S. (2010) New species of Haloceratidae, Columbellidae, Buccinidae, Mitridae, Costellariidae, Amathinidae and Spondylidae from the Philippines. Visaya 3(1):73-93.
