= C. kraussii =

C. kraussii may refer to:

- Clionella kraussii, a sea snail species found in South Africa
- Combretum kraussii, the forest bushwillow, a tree species found in South Africa, Eswatini and Mozambique
