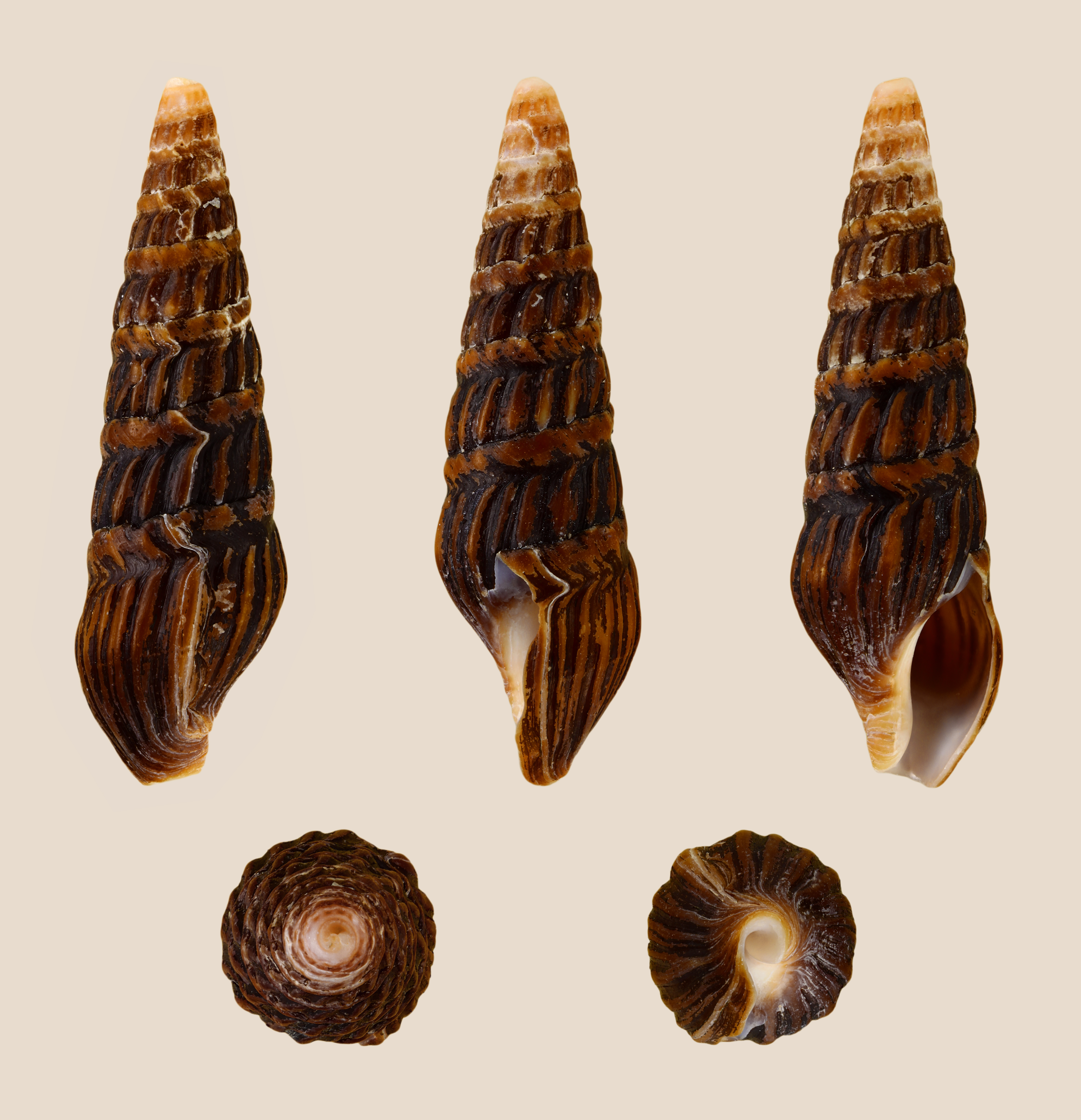

Scientific classification
- Kingdom: Animalia
- Phylum: Mollusca
- Class: Gastropoda
- Subclass: Caenogastropoda
- Order: Neogastropoda
- Superfamily: Conoidea
- Family: Clavatulidae
- Genus: Clionella
- Species: C. confusa

Binomial name
- Clionella confusa E.A. Smith, 1906

= Clionella confusa =

Species of gastropod

Clionella confusa is a species of sea snail, a marine gastropod mollusk in the family Clavatulidae.

== Description ==
The shell grows to a length of 40 mm.

(Original description) The elongate shell has a uniform bright red or yellowish colour. It contains 10 ? whorls (apex broken away). These are rather flat, constricted at the upper part, leaving a rounded girdle beneath the suture, with about 14 slightly oblique costa) below the constriction, by which they are interrupted, so that they are only faintly indicated upon the cingulum above. The ribs upon the body whorl are attenuated anteriorly, but disappear upon the snout. The suture is a little oblique and wavy. The aperture is more or less rosaceous within. The columella is curved, covered with a thin whitish callus. The outer lip is distinctly but not deeply notched at the constriction.

This species has been confounded with Clionella rosaria (Reeve, 1846) because of its bright red colour. Reeve's species, however, appears invariably to have the cingulum at the upper part of the whorls whitish, and more or less spotted with brown. The whorls of that species are more convex, and are distinctly transversely striated. It appears to be smaller also, the largest specimen examined being only 25 mm. in length. It is more variable in colour, sometimes bright red with a white girdle, sometimes brown, mottled with white, or yellowish, flecked with white dots.

== Distribution ==
This marine species occurs from Mossel Bay to North Transkei, South Africa.
