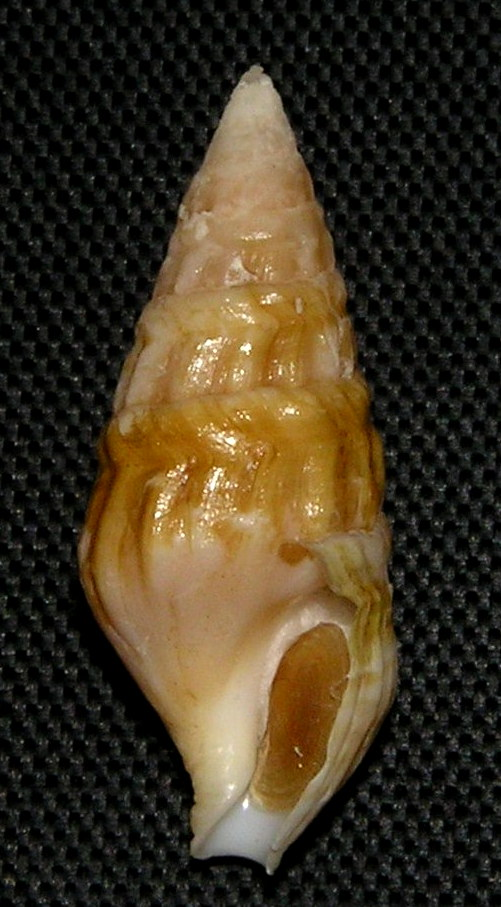
- Apertural view of a shell of Clionella bornii

Scientific classification
- Kingdom: Animalia
- Phylum: Mollusca
- Class: Gastropoda
- Subclass: Caenogastropoda
- Order: Neogastropoda
- Superfamily: Conoidea
- Family: Clavatulidae
- Genus: Clionella
- Species: C. bornii

Binomial name
- Clionella bornii (E.A. Smith, 1877)

Synonyms
- Clionella sinuata bornii (E.A. Smith, 1877); Pleurotoma (Clionella) bornii Smith E. A., 1877

= Clionella bornii =

Species of gastropod

Clionella bornii is a species of sea snail, a marine gastropod mollusk in the family Clavatulidae.

== Description ==
The size of an adult shell varies between 25 mm and 40 mm.

(Freely translated from the original Latin description) The whitish shell is elongated and subturrited. The shell contains about 8 rather flat whorls (the apex is lacking). Just below the suture it shows a bipartite girdle. The space between the longitudinal ribs has a red color These interstices are as long as the ribs. The oblique ribs are numerous and increase from 11–12 on the early whorls to 18 on the body whorl, extending almost to the siphonal canal. The spiral striae show obsolete grooves and are best seen on the early whorls. The oval aperture has a length of about 1/3 the length of the shell. The aperture narrows to a slender point at its top. The very short siphonal canal is slightly curved to the left. The columella is slightly curved in the middle and almost twisted. The outer lip is narrow and shows a rather deep sinus.

This species is closely allied to the well-known Clionella sinuata. It differs, however, in being covered with a paler epidermis, in having below the suture a raised girdle formed by a depression or constriction around the whorls, and also in the style of coloration.

== Distribution ==
This marine species occurs between Jeffrey's Bay and East London, South Africa
