= Toxiclionella tumida =

Scientific classification
- Kingdom: Animalia
- Phylum: Mollusca
- Class: Gastropoda
- Subclass: Caenogastropoda
- Order: Neogastropoda
- Superfamily: Conoidea
- Family: Clavatulidae
- Genus: Toxiclionella
- Species: T. tumida

Binomial name
- Toxiclionella tumida (G.B. Sowerby II, 1870)

Synonyms
- Clavatula tumida Sowerby II, 1870; Clionella (Toxiclionella) tumida Powell, 1966; Pleurotoma tumida Sowerby, 1892

Species of gastropod

Toxiclionella tumida is a species of sea snail, a marine gastropod mollusk in the family Clavatulidae.

== Description ==
The shell grows to a length of 60 mm. The thick shell is subfusiform. The ground color of the shell is light green, with a reddish tone between the arcuate, opisthocline ribs and with a thick, olive-brown periostracum. The acuminate, orthoconic spire ends abruptly in a large blunt protoconch. The whorls are slightly convex. The outer lip shows a thick callus and parietal tubercle. The anal sinus in this species is very wide and rather shallow. The pear-shaped aperture is relatively large. The broad siphonal canal is unnotched and of moderate length. The subsutural cord is strong and more tumid than in Toxiclionella haliplex.

== Distribution ==
This marine species occurs along the Agulhas Bank, South Africa.
