= Belomitra pourtalesii =

Scientific classification
- Kingdom: Animalia
- Phylum: Mollusca
- Class: Gastropoda
- Subclass: Caenogastropoda
- Order: Neogastropoda
- Family: Belomitridae
- Genus: Belomitra
- Species: B. pourtalesii

Binomial name
- Belomitra pourtalesii (Dall, 1881)

Synonyms
- Drillia exsculpta R.B. Watson, 1882; Mangelia exsculpta R.B. Watson, 1881; Mangelia pourtalesii (Dall, 1881); Mangilia areia Dall, 1927; Pleurotoma exsculpta Watson, 1882; Pleurotoma (Mangilia) pourtalesii Dall, 1881 (original combination)

Species of gastropod

Belomitra pourtalesii is a species of sea snail, a marine gastropod mollusc in the family Belomitridae.

== Description ==
The length of the shell varies from 12 mm to 30 mm.

(Original description) The slender, dull, light brown shell is eight-whorled. The protoconch is large, bubble-shaped, smooth and forms a blunt apex. The subsequent whorls are furnished with numerous (on the whorl next to the last 20, and on the last 27) narrow, little-raised, rounded riblets with somewhat wider interspaces, becoming less distinct and more crowded in the adult near the aperture. The posterior terminations of these riblets are waved, forming an obscure notch-band, each being slightly enlarged close by the suture and also on the anterior side of the band, thus forming two rows of indistinct nodulations, of which the sutural row is more clearly defined than the other. The riblets extend from suture to suture, and near its anterior third become obsolete on the body whorl. Here eight or ten rather indistinct revolving threads exist, becoming more distinct toward the end of the siphonal canal, separated from each other by shallow grooves. These pass round the column into the aperture. The siphonal canal is short and wide. The aperture is simple, with thin margins. The notch is rather indistinct in the adult.

== Distribution ==
This species occurs in the Caribbean Sea and the Gulf of Mexico; off the Lesser Antilles; in the Atlantic Ocean off Georgia.
