= Vilma (disambiguation) =

Vilma is a feminine given name.

Vilma may also refer to:

- Clionella vilma, a sea snail
- Jonathan Vilma, American National Football League player
- Vilhelmina Vilma Bardauskienė (born 1953), Lithuanian former long jumper
- Vilma (Philippine TV program), which was aired from 1986 to 1995
- Vilma (grasshopper), a genus of insect in the subfamily Batrachideinae
