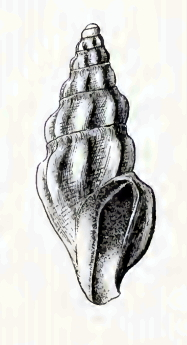
- Original image of a shell of Inodrillia aepynota

Scientific classification
- Kingdom: Animalia
- Phylum: Mollusca
- Class: Gastropoda
- Subclass: Caenogastropoda
- Order: Neogastropoda
- Superfamily: Conoidea
- Family: Horaiclavidae
- Genus: Inodrillia
- Species: I. aepynota

Binomial name
- Inodrillia aepynota (Dall, 1889)

Synonyms
- Drillia (Cymatosyrinx) aepynota Dall, 1889

= Inodrillia aepynota =

Species of gastropod

Inodrillia aepynota is a species of sea snail, a marine gastropod mollusk in the family Horaiclavidae.

It was previously included within the family Turridae.

Fossils have been found in Quaternary strata of Florida, USA; age range: 2.588 to 0.781 Ma

== Description ==
The length of the shell attains 15 mm.

(Original description) The short, stout shell has a smooth rounded whitish inflated protoconch of two whorls and eight subsequent whorls. The color of the shell is whitish or pale madder brown. The spiral sculpture consists of obsolete spiral striae, generally a little wavy, and often absent from a part or the whole of the shell. They are strongest on the base, but are generally so faint as not to interrupt the apparent smoothness of the surface nor to be perceptible without a lens. The suture is appressed, undulated over the ribs. The fasciole is narrow, excavated, smooth except for lines of growth and the undulations due to the ribbing. The transverse sculpture consists of rather faint growth lines and of (on the body whorl 12) strong, stout rounded ribs, strongest in front of the fasciole where they end bluntly, extending across the whorl and disappearing only on the siphonal canal. The interspaces are about equal to the ribs, which are slightly obliquely set. The varix is large, stout and simple. The outer lip in front of it is thin, arched, not internally lirate. The aperture is rather narrow. The notch is subcircular. The inner lip and the columella show an elevated rather thick callus. The columella is concave. The siphonal canal is short, distinct, deep, curved to the right in the adult. The siphonal fasciole is distinct.

== Distribution ==
This marine species occurs from North Carolina, USA, to Puerto Rico.
