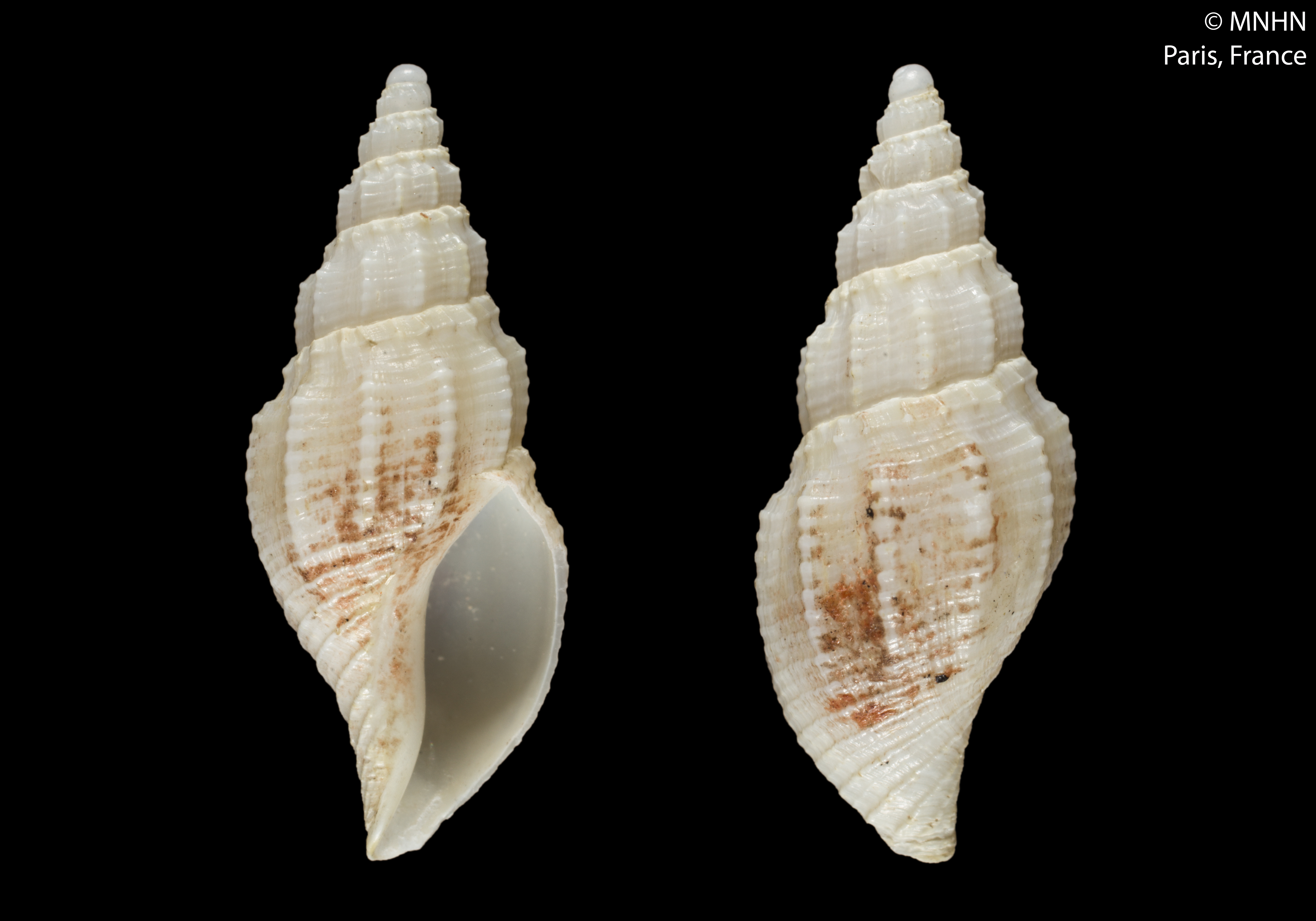

Scientific classification
- Kingdom: Animalia
- Phylum: Mollusca
- Class: Gastropoda
- Subclass: Caenogastropoda
- Order: Neogastropoda
- Family: Belomitridae
- Genus: Belomitra
- Species: B. quadruplex

Binomial name
- Belomitra quadruplex (Watson, 1882)

Synonyms
- Bela guernei Dautzenberg, 1891; Belomitra fischeri Locard, 1897; Belomitra lyrata Locard, 1897; Belomitra paradoxa P. Fischer, 1883; Belomitra spelta Locard, 1897; Clionella conspicienda Locard, 1897; Clionella delicatulina Locard, 1897; Jumala brychia Verrill & Smith in Verrill, 1885; Mangelia climakis (Watson, 1886); Oenopota brychia (Verrill & Smith in Verrill, 1885); Oenopota conspicienda (Locard, 1897); Oenopota lyrata (Locard, 1897); Oenopota spelta (Locard, 1897); Pleurotoma climakis Watson, 1886; Pleurotoma quadruplex Watson, 1882

= Belomitra quadruplex =

Species of gastropod

Belomitra quadruplex is a species of sea snail, a marine gastropod mollusc in the family Belomitridae, the whelks.

== Description ==
The shell of Belomitra quadruplex varies in length from approximately 10 mm to 41 mm. It has a fusiform (spindle-shaped) structure with a tall spire and a moderately long siphonal canal, features typical of the family Belomitridae.

The teleoconch displays both axial ribs and spiral cords, resulting in a finely reticulate (net-like) surface sculpture. The aperture is elongate and ovate, with a thin outer lip. The shell coloration is typically light brown to yellowish, though coloration can vary with depth and locality.

The protoconch is small and smooth, suggesting planktotrophic larval development. Although there is no specific ecological study on this species’ diet, members of the genus Belomitra are presumed to be carnivorous or scavengers, as is common among deep-sea neogastropods.

== Distribution ==
This species is distributed in European waters, the Atlantic Ocean off the Azores and off New England, United States.
