= Clionella liltvedi =

Scientific classification
- Kingdom: Animalia
- Phylum: Mollusca
- Class: Gastropoda
- Subclass: Caenogastropoda
- Order: Neogastropoda
- Superfamily: Conoidea
- Family: Clavatulidae
- Genus: Clionella
- Species: C. liltvedi

Binomial name
- Clionella liltvedi Kilburn, 1985

Species of gastropod

Clionella liltvedi is a species of sea snail, a marine gastropod mollusk in the family Clavatulidae.

== Description ==
The length of the shell attains 29 mm.

The elongated shell has a narrowly bucciniform shape. The spire whorls are convex, the body whorl oblong. The ground color of the shell is dark brown with paler brown between the cords on the base. . The axial ribs are slightly nodular by groups of widely spaced spiral ridges. These ribs are strong and rather straight, initially numbering about 10 per whorl and increasing to 17–20 on the penultimate whorl.

== Distribution ==
This marine species occurs along Table Bay and west coast of Cape Peninsula, South Africa.
