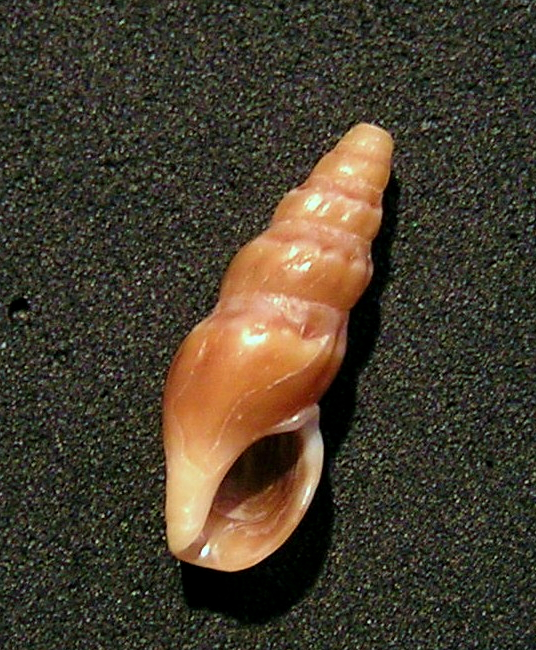
- Apertural view of a shell of Crassiclava layardi

Scientific classification
- Kingdom: Animalia
- Phylum: Mollusca
- Class: Gastropoda
- Subclass: Caenogastropoda
- Order: Neogastropoda
- Superfamily: Conoidea
- Family: Pseudomelatomidae
- Genus: Crassiclava
- Species: C. layardi

Binomial name
- Crassiclava layardi (Sowerby III, 1897)

Synonyms
- Clavatula hottentota Barnard, 1958; Crassispira hottentota Kilburn, 1970; Crassispira layardi (Sowerby III, 1897); Drillia hottentota (non Smith, 1882); (partim) Barnard, 1958; Drillia layardi (Sowerby III, 1897); Drillia sowerbyi Turton, 1932 (non Pleurotoma sowerbyi Reeve, 1843); Pleurotoma castanea (non Reeve, 1845) Sowerby, 1886; Pleurotoma layardi Sowerby III, 1897; Pleurotoma (Drillia) layardi Sowerby III, 1897 (original combination)

= Crassiclava layardi =

Species of gastropod

Crassiclava layardi is a species of sea snail, a marine gastropod mollusk in the family Pseudomelatomidae, the turrids and allies.

== Description ==
The length of the shell attains 12 mm, its diameter 4 mm.

The smooth, turreted, narrowly claviform shell is reddish brown to uniform dark brown. It shows 7 moderately strong longitudinal ribs. It contains 7 obtusely angulated whorls, above the shoulder slightly concave, below almost convex. The spiral lirae are feeble. The aperture is oblong-ovate. The columella is upright and shows a slight callus on top. The outer lip is arcuate with a wide sinus and not deeply emarginate.

== Distribution ==
This marine species occurs from Table Bay to East London, South Africa
