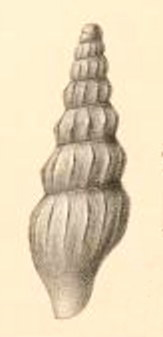
- Inodrillia nucleata shell

Scientific classification
- Kingdom: Animalia
- Phylum: Mollusca
- Class: Gastropoda
- Subclass: Caenogastropoda
- Order: Neogastropoda
- Superfamily: Conoidea
- Family: Horaiclavidae
- Genus: Inodrillia; Bartsch, 1943

Type species
- Pleurotoma nucleata Dall, 1881

Species
- See text

Synonyms
- Inodrillara Bartsch, 1943; Inodrillina Bartsch, 1943

= Inodrillia =

Genus of gastropods

Inodrillia is a genus of sea snails, marine gastropod mollusks in the family Horaiclavidae.

It was previously included within the subfamily Crassispirinae, family Turridae.

== Species ==
Species within the genus Inodrillia include:

- Inodrillia acloneta (Dall, 1889)
- Inodrillia acova Bartsch, 1943
- Inodrillia acrybia (Dall, 1889)
- Inodrillia aepynota (Dall, 1889)
- Inodrillia amblytera (Bush, 1893)
- Inodrillia avira Bartsch, 1943
- Inodrillia dalli (Verrill & Smith, 1882)
- Inodrillia dido Bartsch, 1943
- Inodrillia gibba Bartsch, 1943
- Inodrillia hatterasensis Bartsch, 1943
- Inodrillia hesperia Bartsch, 1943
- Inodrillia hilda Bartsch, 1943
- Inodrillia ino Bartsch, 1943
- Inodrillia martha Bartsch, 1943
- Inodrillia miamia Bartsch, 1943
- Inodrillia nucleata (Dall, 1881)
- Inodrillia pharcida (Dall, 1889)
- Inodrillia prolongata (E. A. Smith, 1890)
- Inodrillia ricardoi Rios, 2009
- Inodrillia vetula Bartsch, 1943
- † Inodrillia whitfieldi Martin 1904

Species brought into synonymy

- Inodrillia carpenteri (Verrill & Smith [in Verrill], 1880): synonym of Cymatosyrinx carpenteri (Verrill & S. Smith [in Verrill], 1880)
- Inodrillia cestrota (Dall, 1889): synonym of Inodrillia dalli (Verrill & S. Smith [in Verrill], 1882)
- Inodrillia ustickei Nowell-Usticke, 1959: synonym of Neodrillia cydia Bartsch, 1943
- Inodrillia vinki Jong & Coomans, 1988: synonym of Splendrillia vinki (De Jong & Coomans, 1988)
