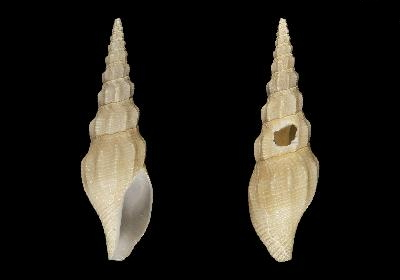
- Shell of Belomitra comitas (holotype in MNHN, Paris)

Scientific classification
- Kingdom: Animalia
- Phylum: Mollusca
- Class: Gastropoda
- Subclass: Caenogastropoda
- Order: Neogastropoda
- Superfamily: Buccinoidea
- Family: Belomitridae
- Genus: Belomitra; Fischer, 1882

Type species
- Belomitra paradoxa P. Fischer, 1883

Synonyms
- Bathyclionella Kobelt, 1905; Cryptomitra Dall, 1924; Dellina Beu, 1970; Morrisonella Bartsch, 1945; Pleurobela Monterosato in Locard, 1897

= Belomitra =

Genus of gastropods

Belomitra is a genus of sea snails, marine gastropod mollusks in the family Belomitridae.

== Species ==
Species within the genus Belomitra include:

- Belomitra admete Kantor, Puillandre, Rivasseau & Bouchet, 2012
- Belomitra aikeni (Lussi, 2011)
- Belomitra aoteana (Dell, 1956)
- Belomitra bouteti Kantor, Puillandre, Rivasseau & Bouchet, 2012
- Belomitra brachymitra Kantor, Puillandre, Rivasseau & Bouchet, 2012
- Belomitra brachytoma (Schepman, 1913)
- Belomitra caudata Kantor, Puillandre, Rivasseau & Bouchet, 2012
- Belomitra challengeri (E. A. Smith, 1891)
- Belomitra chasmata (Dall, 1927)
- Belomitra christina (Dall, 1927)
- Belomitra climacella (Dall, 1895)
- Belomitra comitas Kantor, Puillandre, Rivasseau & Bouchet, 2012
- Belomitra decapitata Kantor, Puillandre, Rivasseau & Bouchet, 2012
- Belomitra granulata Kantor, Puillandre, Rivasseau & Bouchet, 2012
- Belomitra gymnobela Kantor, Puillandre, Rivasseau & Bouchet, 2012
- Belomitra hypsomitra Kantor, Puillandre, Rivasseau & Bouchet, 2012
- Belomitra leobrerorum Poppe & Tagaro, 2010
- Belomitra minutula Kantor, Puillandre, Rivasseau & Bouchet, 2012
- Belomitra nesiotica Kantor, Puillandre, Rivasseau & Bouchet, 2012
- Belomitra pacifica (Dall, 1908)
- Belomitra paschalis (Thiele, 1925)
- Belomitra pourtalesii (Dall, 1881)
- Belomitra problematica (Thiele, 1925)
- Belomitra quadruplex (Watson, 1882)
- Belomitra radula Kantor, Puillandre, Rivasseau & Bouchet, 2012
- Belomitra reticulata Kantor, Puillandre, Rivasseau & Bouchet, 2012
- Belomitra richardi (Dautzenberg & Fischer, 1906)
- Belomitra subula Kantor, Puillandre, Rivasseau & Bouchet, 2012
- Belomitra torquata (Barnard, 1963)
- Belomitra viridis (Okutani, 1966)

Species brought into synonymy

- Belomitra fischeri Locard, 1897: synonym of Belomitra quadruplex (R. B. Watson, 1882)
- Belomitra lyrata Locard, 1897: synonym of Belomitra quadruplex (R. B. Watson, 1882)
- Belomitra paradoxa P. Fischer, 1883: synonym of Belomitra quadruplex (R. B. Watson, 1882)
- Belomitra spelta Locard, 1897: synonym of Belomitra quadruplex (R. B. Watson, 1882)
