= Inodrillia ino =

Scientific classification
- Kingdom: Animalia
- Phylum: Mollusca
- Class: Gastropoda
- Subclass: Caenogastropoda
- Order: Neogastropoda
- Superfamily: Conoidea
- Family: Horaiclavidae
- Genus: Inodrillia
- Species: I. ino

Binomial name
- Inodrillia ino Bartsch, 1943

Synonyms
- Inodrillia (Inodrillara) ino Bartsch, 1943

Species of gastropod

Inodrillia ino is a species of sea snail, a marine gastropod mollusk in the family Horaiclavidae.

It was previously included within the family Turridae.

== Description ==
The length of the shell attains 8.1 mm.

== Distribution ==
This marine species occurs off the Florida Keys, USA, found at depths between 183 and 247 m.
