= Inodrillia hatterasensis =

Scientific classification
- Kingdom: Animalia
- Phylum: Mollusca
- Class: Gastropoda
- Subclass: Caenogastropoda
- Order: Neogastropoda
- Superfamily: Conoidea
- Family: Horaiclavidae
- Genus: Inodrillia
- Species: I. hatterasensis

Binomial name
- Inodrillia hatterasensis Bartsch, 1943

Synonyms
- Inodrillia (Inodrillara) hatterasensis Bartsch, 1943

Species of gastropod

Inodrillia hatterasensis is a species of sea snail, a marine gastropod mollusk in the family Horaiclavidae.

It was previously included within the family Turridae, the turrids.

== Description ==
The length of the shell attains 17 mm.

== Distribution ==
This marine species occurs off North Carolina, USA, at depths between 115 and 260 m.
