= Inodrillia martha =

Scientific classification
- Kingdom: Animalia
- Phylum: Mollusca
- Class: Gastropoda
- Subclass: Caenogastropoda
- Order: Neogastropoda
- Superfamily: Conoidea
- Family: Horaiclavidae
- Genus: Inodrillia
- Species: I. martha

Binomial name
- Inodrillia martha Bartsch, 1943

Synonyms
- Inodrillia (Inodrillara) martha Bartsch, 1943; Pleurotoma dalli auct. non Verrill & Smith, 1882

Species of gastropod

Inodrillia martha is a species of sea snail, a marine gastropod mollusk in the family Horaiclavidae.

It was previously included within the family Turridae.

== Description ==
The length of the shell attains 17 mm.

== Distribution ==
This marine species occurs off Martha's Vineyard, off New England, USA, at depths between 187 and 344 m.
