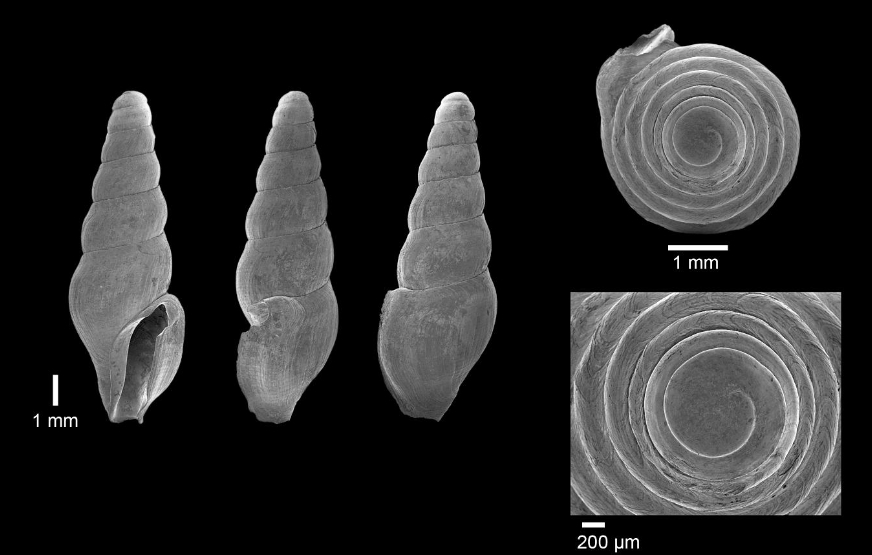
- Shell and protoconch of Inodrillia acloneta (holotype at the Smithsonian Institution)

Scientific classification
- Kingdom: Animalia
- Phylum: Mollusca
- Class: Gastropoda
- Subclass: Caenogastropoda
- Order: Neogastropoda
- Superfamily: Conoidea
- Family: Horaiclavidae
- Genus: Inodrillia
- Species: I. acloneta

Binomial name
- Inodrillia acloneta (Dall, 1889)

Synonyms
- Drillia dalli var. acloneta Dall, 1889 (basionym)

= Inodrillia acloneta =

Species of gastropod

Inodrillia acloneta is a species of sea snail, a marine gastropod mollusk in the family Horaiclavidae.

It was previously included within the family Drilliidae and then in Turridae.

== Description ==
The length of the shell attains 12 mm.

(Original description) This species, recognizable by its large blunt tip and brownish livid streaks or tint, is notably variable. The variety which I have called acloneta is totally without ribs, and for this reason the fasciole is less apparent.

== Distribution ==
This marine species occurs off the Florida Keys, USA, Martinique; the Mid-Atlantic Ridge
