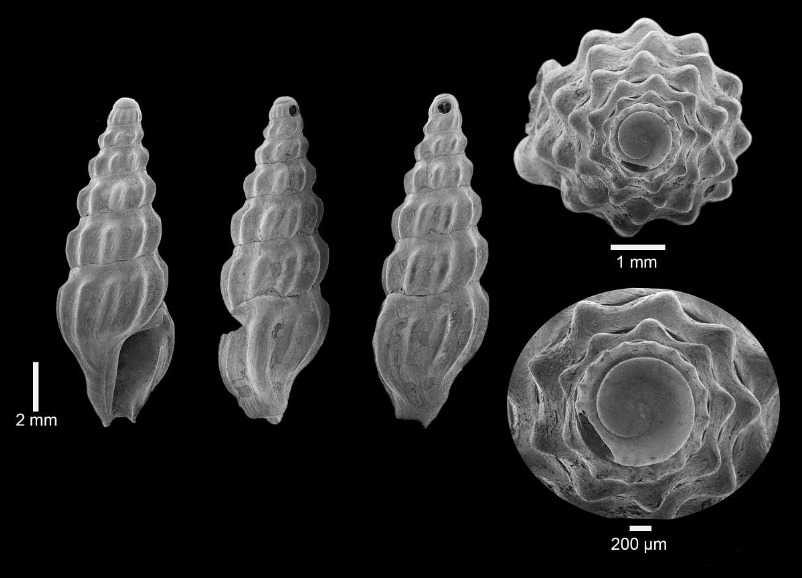
- Shell and protoconch of Inodrillia dalli (holotype of Drillia dalli var. cestrota at the Smithsonian Institution)

Scientific classification
- Kingdom: Animalia
- Phylum: Mollusca
- Class: Gastropoda
- Subclass: Caenogastropoda
- Order: Neogastropoda
- Superfamily: Conoidea
- Family: Horaiclavidae
- Genus: Inodrillia
- Species: I. dalli

Binomial name
- Inodrillia dalli (Verrill & S. Smith, 1882)

Synonyms
- Drillia dalli (Verrill & Smith, 1882); Drillia dalli var. cestrota W.H. Dall, 1889; Inodrillia cestrota (Dall, 1889); Mangelia dalli A.E. Verrill & S. Smith, 1882; Pleurotoma (Drillia) dalli Verrill & Smith, 1882

= Inodrillia dalli =

Species of gastropod

Inodrillia dalli is a species of sea snail, a marine gastropod mollusk in the family Horaiclavidae.

It was previously included within the family Drilliidae and then in Turridae.

== Description ==
The length of the shell varies between 15 mm and 27 mm.

This species, recognizable by its large blunt tip and brownish livid streaks or tint, is notably variable. The ribs much stronger than in the typical form, and closer set; they even undulate the fasciole a little.

== Distribution ==
This marine species occurs from New Jersey to Florida, US.
