= Crassiclava balteata =

Scientific classification
- Kingdom: Animalia
- Phylum: Mollusca
- Class: Gastropoda
- Subclass: Caenogastropoda
- Order: Neogastropoda
- Superfamily: Conoidea
- Family: Pseudomelatomidae
- Genus: Crassiclava
- Species: C. balteata

Binomial name
- Crassiclava balteata Kilburn, 1988

Species of gastropod

Crassiclava balteata is a species of sea snail, a marine gastropod mollusk in the family Pseudomelatomidae.

== Description ==
The length of the shell attains 14.5 mm, with a diameter of 5.1 mm.

== Distribution ==
This marine species occurs off the Agulhas Bank, South Africa.
