= Inodrillia ricardoi =

Scientific classification
- Kingdom: Animalia
- Phylum: Mollusca
- Class: Gastropoda
- Subclass: Caenogastropoda
- Order: Neogastropoda
- Superfamily: Conoidea
- Family: Horaiclavidae
- Genus: Inodrillia
- Species: I. ricardoi

Binomial name
- Inodrillia ricardoi Rios, 2009

Species of gastropod

Inodrillia ricardoi is a species of sea snail, a marine gastropod mollusk in the family Horaiclavidae.

== Distribution ==
This marine species occurs in the Atlantic Ocean off Brazil.
