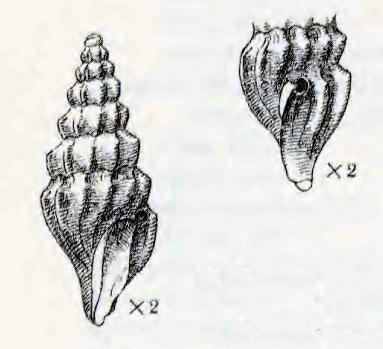
- Original image of a shell of Inodrillia amblytera

Scientific classification
- Kingdom: Animalia
- Phylum: Mollusca
- Class: Gastropoda
- Subclass: Caenogastropoda
- Order: Neogastropoda
- Superfamily: Conoidea
- Family: Horaiclavidae
- Genus: Inodrillia
- Species: I. amblytera

Binomial name
- Inodrillia amblytera (K.J. Bush, 1893)

Synonyms
- Drillia amblytera K.J. Bush, 1893; Pleurotoma (Drillia) amblytera Bush, 1893; Pleurotoma amblytera Bush, 1893 (original combination)

= Inodrillia amblytera =

Species of gastropod

Inodrillia amblytera is a species of sea snail, a marine gastropod mollusk in the family Horaiclavidae.

It was previously included within the family Turridae, the turrids.

== Description ==
The length of the shell attains 15 mm, its diameter 6 mm.

(Original description) The shell consists of eight whorls, rather thick, of a light yellow color, sometimes banded with reddish brown. The posterior sinus is nearly round, situated just below the suture, and has, in the best developed specimen, a thin, sharp edge rising a little above the surface of the shell, bending decidedly backward, then curving and nearly meeting in front. The outer lip rounds gradually to near the anterior end of the aperture, where it is slightly contracted, making a short, broad siphonal canal, then twisting abruptly backward produces a decided notch before joining the columella. A conspicuous varix is formed by the thickening of the last rib, beyond which the outer lip is thin, white, and sharp-edged. There is a prominent, tooth-like projection on the interior of the aperture, at the end of the varix, more conspicuous in some specimens than in others, and seen best in an end view. The interior of the aperture and the inner lip is white. The columella is straight, with a conspicuous layer of enamel having a thin, free edge. The suture is distinct, undulating. The subsutural band is very narrow, concave, lapping well on the preceding whorl. Prominent, strong, oblique, rounded ribs, nine on the body whorl, separated by concave spaces of about the same width, cross the whorls from suture to suture, faintly defined on the subsutural band, and most prominent just below it. On the body whorl, these gradually lade away at the base of the siphon, and appear on the siphonal canal as conspicuous, much curved lines of growth. Microscopic striae intersect the fine lines of growth, giving to the entire surface of the shell a peculiar crinkled appearance. The protoconch is broad, blunt, smooth, somewhat shining, consisting of two and a half whorls. The apical whorl is large, rising very little above the succeeding one.

== Distribution ==
This marine species occurs off North Carolina and South Carolina, USA, at depths between 137 and 260 m
