= Clionella lobatopsis =

Scientific classification
- Kingdom: Animalia
- Phylum: Mollusca
- Class: Gastropoda
- Subclass: Caenogastropoda
- Order: Neogastropoda
- Superfamily: Conoidea
- Family: Clavatulidae
- Genus: Clionella
- Species: C. lobatopsis

Binomial name
- Clionella lobatopsis (Barnard, 1963)

Synonyms
- Clavatula lobatopsis Barnard, 1963

Species of gastropod

Clionella lobatopsis is a species of sea snail, a marine gastropod mollusk in the family Clavatulidae.

Clavatula lobatopsis Barnard, 1963, was transferred to Gemmula (Ptychosyrinx) in the Turrinae by Kilburn (1983)

== Distribution ==
This marine species occurs off the West Cape Province, Rep. South Africa
