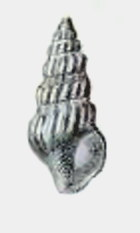
- Original drawing of a shell of Clionella subcontracta

Scientific classification
- Kingdom: Animalia
- Phylum: Mollusca
- Class: Gastropoda
- Subclass: Caenogastropoda
- Order: Neogastropoda
- Superfamily: Conoidea
- Family: Clavatulidae
- Genus: Clionella
- Species: C. subcontracta

Binomial name
- Clionella subcontracta (E.A. Smith, 1904)

Synonyms
- Drillia subcontracta Smith E. A., 1904; Mangilia nereia Turton, W.H., 1932

= Clionella subcontracta =

Species of gastropod

Clionella subcontracta is a species of sea snail, a marine gastropod mollusk in the family Clavatulidae.

== Description ==
The size of an adult shell varies between 8 mm and 1 mm.

The dark yellowish-brown shell is elongate but has a narrow base. It contains eight whorls; the first two are convex, the others concave on top, convex below. The whorls are thus strongly constricted below the suture. The suboval aperture measures about a third of the total length of the shell. The body whorl is well rounded at the middle and then contracted below. The almost straight axial ribs number 13–16 per whorl. A spiral striation or groove at the periphery, which also winds up the spire just above the suture, is usually more strongly marked than the rest. The siphonal canal is not notched.

The characteristics of the shell - the small size, the glossy brown shell and the lack of variation - make Clionellla subcontracta an atypical species within the genus Clionella.

== Distribution ==
This marine species occurs off Namaqualand to Port Alfred, South Africa.
