= Inodrillia miamia =

Scientific classification
- Kingdom: Animalia
- Phylum: Mollusca
- Class: Gastropoda
- Subclass: Caenogastropoda
- Order: Neogastropoda
- Superfamily: Conoidea
- Family: Horaiclavidae
- Genus: Inodrillia
- Species: I. miamia

Binomial name
- Inodrillia miamia Bartsch, 1943

Synonyms
- Inodrillia (Inodrillara) miamia Bartsch, 1943

Species of gastropod

Inodrillia miamia is a species of sea snail, a marine gastropod mollusk in the family Horaiclavidae.

It was previously included within the family Turridae.

== History ==
It was initially described by Bartsch in 1943 and was previously classified in the family Turridae

== Description ==
The length of the shell attains 14.5 mm. It has a shell.

== Distribution ==
This marine species occurs off East Florida, USA, at depths between 42 and 229 m.
