= Inodrillia hesperia =

Scientific classification
- Kingdom: Animalia
- Phylum: Mollusca
- Class: Gastropoda
- Subclass: Caenogastropoda
- Order: Neogastropoda
- Superfamily: Conoidea
- Family: Horaiclavidae
- Genus: Inodrillia
- Species: I. hesperia

Binomial name
- Inodrillia hesperia Bartsch, 1943

Synonyms
- Inodrillia (Inodrillara) hesperia Bartsch, 1943

Species of sea snail

Inodrillia hesperia is a species of sea snail, a marine gastropod mollusk in the family Horaiclavidae.

It was previously included within the family Turridae.

== Description ==
The length of the shell varies between 7 mm and 15 mm.

== Distribution ==
This marine species occurs off the Florida Keys, USA, and in the Caribbean Sea off Venezuela at depths between 201 and 263 m.
