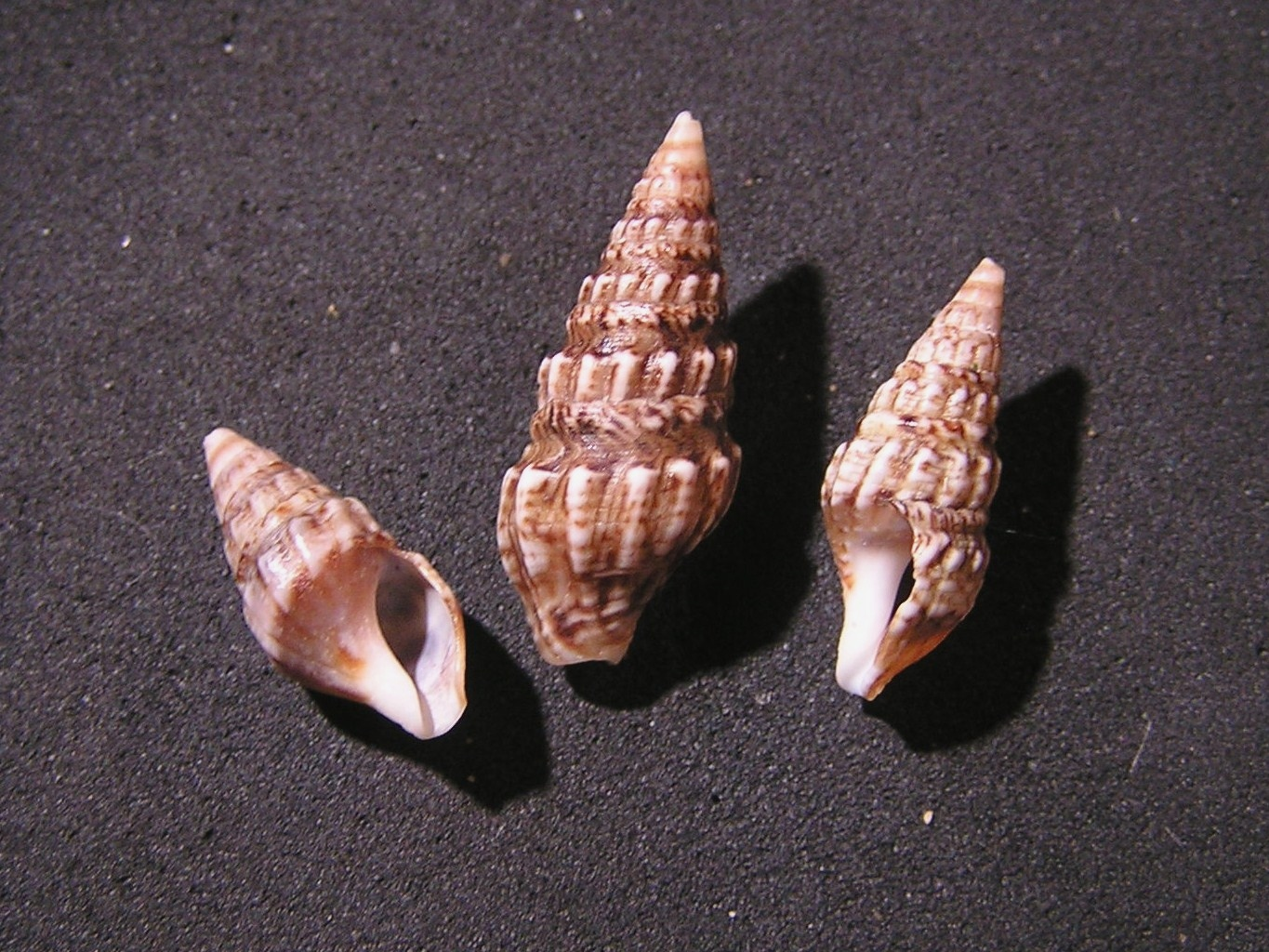
- Clionella subventricosa kaffraria

Scientific classification
- Kingdom: Animalia
- Phylum: Mollusca
- Class: Gastropoda
- Subclass: Caenogastropoda
- Order: Neogastropoda
- Superfamily: Conoidea
- Family: Clavatulidae
- Genus: Clionella
- Species: C. subventricosa

Binomial name
- Clionella subventricosa (E.A. Smith, 1877)

Synonyms
- Clavatula subventricosa (E. A. Smith, 1877); Clionella subventricosa subventricosa (E. A. Smith, 1877) · accepted, alternate representation; Pleurotoma subventricosa Smith E. A., 1877 (original combination)

= Clionella subventricosa =

Species of gastropod

Clionella subventricosa is a species of sea snail, a marine gastropod mollusc in the family Clavatulidae.

Subspecies

- Clionella subventricosa kaffraria Kilburn, 1985 (Eastern Cape subspecies)
- Clionella subventricosa subventricosa (E. A. Smith, 1877)

== Description ==
The shell grows to a length of 22 mm.

The ovate, rather dark brown shell has a squat, fusiform shape. The eight whorls are slightly convex. The spiral sculpture shows shallow, well-spaced grooves. The axial ribs are rounded and number 11-14 per whorl. The shoulder angle lies below the middle of the whorl. The periphery is flattened so that body whorl is weakly biangulate. The aperture is rather large with a rather narrow, slightly notched siphonal canal. The color inside the aperture shows various shades of pale brown. The anal sinus is very shallow.

== Distribution ==
This marine species occurs from False Bay to Cape Agulhas, South Africa
