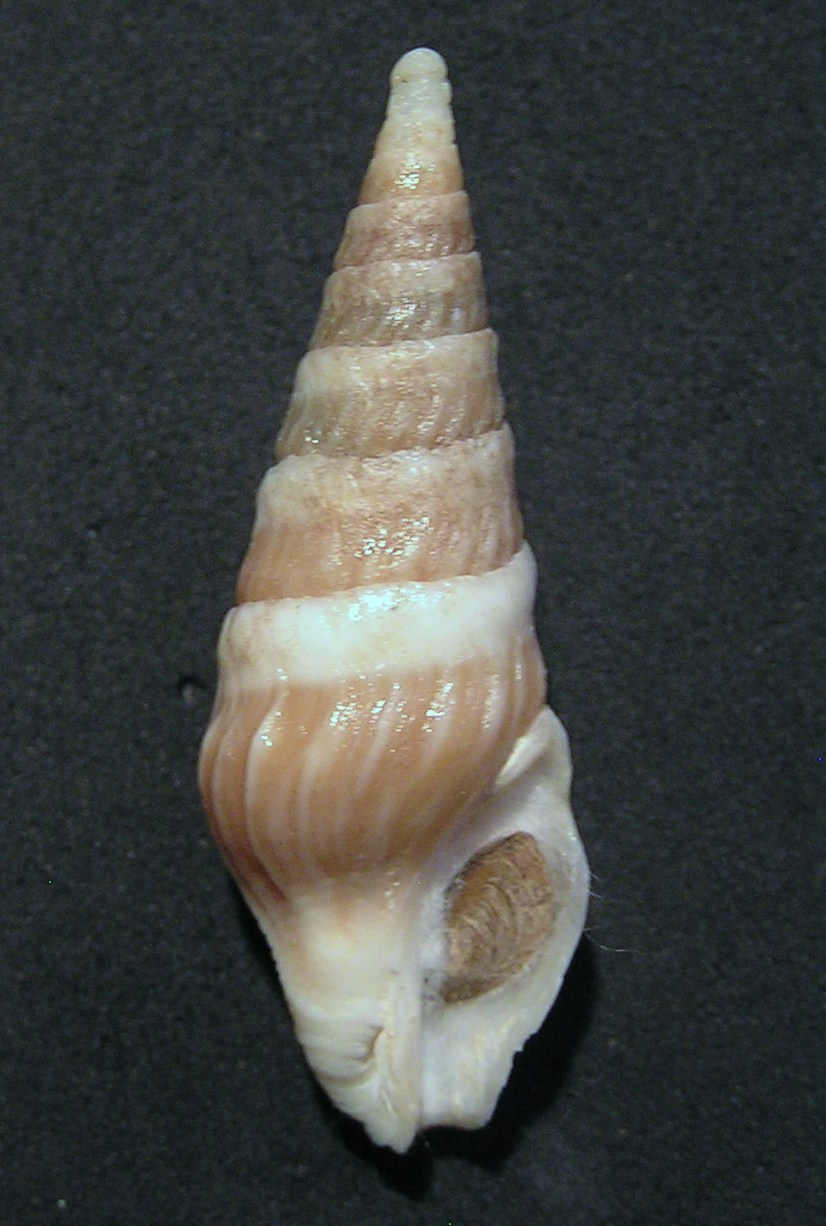
- Apertural view of a shell of Toxiclionella impages

Scientific classification
- Kingdom: Animalia
- Phylum: Mollusca
- Class: Gastropoda
- Subclass: Caenogastropoda
- Order: Neogastropoda
- Superfamily: Conoidea
- Family: Clavatulidae
- Genus: Toxiclionella
- Species: T. impages

Binomial name
- Toxiclionella impages (Adams & Reeve, 1848)

Synonyms
- Drillia impages Adams & Reeve, 1848; Pleurotoma impages Adams & Reeve, 1848

= Toxiclionella impages =

Species of gastropod

Toxiclionella impages is a species of sea snail, a marine gastropod mollusk in the family Clavatulidae.

== Description ==
The shell grows to a length of 50 mm. The shell is flexuously, narrowly ribbed or plicate. The plicae extend to the suture, but not prominent. The color of the shell is yellowish brown.

== Distribution ==
This marine species occurs off the Agulhas Bank, South Africa.
