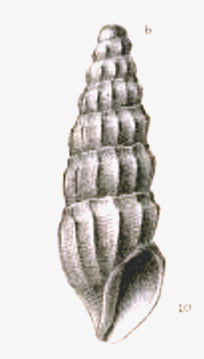
- Original drawing of a shell of Clionella aglaophanes

Scientific classification
- Kingdom: Animalia
- Phylum: Mollusca
- Class: Gastropoda
- Subclass: Caenogastropoda
- Order: Neogastropoda
- Superfamily: Conoidea
- Family: Clavatulidae
- Genus: Clionella
- Species: C. aglaophanes

Binomial name
- Clionella aglaophanes (Watson, 1882)

Synonyms
- Drillia aglaophanes Watson, 1882; Globidrillia aglaophanes R.B. Watson, 1882; Pleurotoma aglaophanes Watson, 1882

= Clionella aglaophanes =

Species of gastropod

Clionella aglaophanes is a species of sea snail, a marine gastropod mollusk in the family Clavatulidae.

== Description ==
The shell grows to a length of 7.6 mm.

(Original description) The shell is high, narrow, conically cylindrical, with a blunt, flatly rounded apex, a short conical base, and scarcely any snout. It is hardly angulated, ribbed, contracted in the sinus area, but barely so at the suture. Its colour is grey, with a silvery sheen.

The longitudinal sculpture shows the whorls crossed from suture to suture by low, sharpish, subangulately projecting, dextrally convex, hardly oblique ribs, which run continuously, but are slightly diminishing in number, up the spire, there being about 15 on the last and 11 on the first regular whorl. On the base they bend strongly to the right, and die out at the point of the snout. They are parted by hollowed furrows which are rather broader than they. Both ribs and furrows are scratched with very fine, almost microscopic lines of growth, which coincide with the course of the ribs. In the furrows a few of these lines are slightly stronger than the rest. The spiral sculpture shows below the sinus-area a very slight angular projection of the whorls, which is made more marked by a thickening and elevation of the ribs at this point. This is a feature which on the earlier whorls is very distinct, the whole rib being individualised by the central nodule into which it rises. But further on these nodules lose in importance. At the top of each whorl and close to the suture lies a small flattened thread, rising into minute longitudinal nodules at the ribs. Below this and above the angulation is a slight furrow where the scars of the old sinuses occur. In all this part the surface of the shell is covered by minute spiral threads which lower down become stronger. They are parted by minute furrows of about the same breadth as the threads. These are all exquisitely fretted by the longitudinal scratches.

The colour of the shell is greyish, polished, with a very beautiful silvery sheen on the whole surface.

The spire is conically cylindrical. The body whorl is small and the apex broad in proportion to the size of the shell. The profile-lines are hardly interrupted by the sutures. The apex consists of 1¼ broad, depressed, and flatly rounded, smooth whorls. The eight whorls increase very slowly. They are short, the last very small, being scarcely at all more tumid than the rest, and having a short conical base. The snout is very short. There is a small constriction round the top of each whorl. The profile-lines are faintly angulated, but are very slightly convex. The fine suture is well marked, being a little impressed and defined by the slight swelling round the top of the inferior whorl. The superior whorl scarcely contracts towards it. The aperture is pear-shaped, with a slight angulation at the top and a very short siphonal canal below. The outer lip is evidently thickened, but chipped in the only specimen present. It runs with an almost continuous slightly convex curve from the body to the siphonal canal, where the curve is slightly and shortly flattened. The sinus is very shallow and open. The inner lip is thickened and raised on a small but defined callus. It runs straight across the body to the base of the short, thick columella, down which it proceeds direct and parallel to the slightly prominent callus-edge on the left. The point of the columella is rounded and blunt, and hardly advances to the end of the snout, the canal-edge being thick and rounded, cut off obliquely upwards, but not at all reverted.

This is an extremely peculiar little shell, remarkable in its narrow cylindrical and compact form, its sculpture, and its slight silvery sheen, from which last feature its name is derived.

== Distribution ==
This marine species occurs off Puerto Rico, St Thomas and the Virgin Islands
