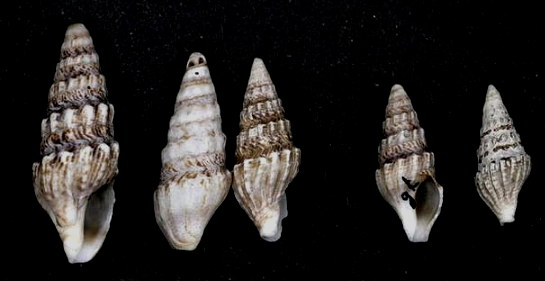
- A collection of shells of Clionella kraussii (museums specimens at Naturalis Biodiversity Center)

Scientific classification
- Kingdom: Animalia
- Phylum: Mollusca
- Class: Gastropoda
- Subclass: Caenogastropoda
- Order: Neogastropoda
- Superfamily: Conoidea
- Family: Clavatulidae
- Genus: Clionella
- Species: C. kraussii

Binomial name
- Clionella kraussii (E.A. Smith, 1877)

Synonyms
- Clavatula kraussii (E. A. Smith, 1877); Clionella krausii (E. A. Smith, 1877); Pleurotoma krausii E.A. Smith, 1877

= Clionella kraussii =

Species of gastropod

Clionella kraussii is a species of sea snail, a marine gastropod mollusk in the family Clavatulidae.

This species was named after Ferdinand Krauss (1812–1890), author of Krauss (1848), Die südafrikanischen Mollusken, ein Beitrag zur Kenntniss der Mollusken des Kap- und Natallandes und zur geographischen Verbreitung derselben, mit Beschreibung und Abbildung der neuen Arten; Stuttgart, Ebner & Seubert, 1848.

== Description ==
The size of an adult shell varies between 15 mm and 40 mm.

This species is easily recognized by the short subnodulous ribs, which occupy scarcely the lower half of the whorls, the depression round the middle and the raised band above, and the manner of coloration, the purplish-brown maculations being somewhat flexuous in the depression. Its nearest relation is Clionella semicostata (Kiener, 1840).

== Distribution ==
This marine species occurs along False Bay and West Transkei, South Africa; also off Madagascar.
