= Inodrillia avira =

Scientific classification
- Kingdom: Animalia
- Phylum: Mollusca
- Class: Gastropoda
- Subclass: Caenogastropoda
- Order: Neogastropoda
- Superfamily: Conoidea
- Family: Horaiclavidae
- Genus: Inodrillia
- Species: I. avira

Binomial name
- Inodrillia avira Bartsch, 1943

Synonyms
- Inodrillia (Inodrillara) avira Bartsch, 1943

Species of gastropod

Inodrillia avira is a species of sea snail, a marine gastropod mollusk in the family Horaiclavidae.

It was previously included within the family Turridae.

== Description ==
The length of the shell attains 10.1 mm.

== Distribution ==
This marine species occurs off East Florida, at depths between 183 and 382 m.
