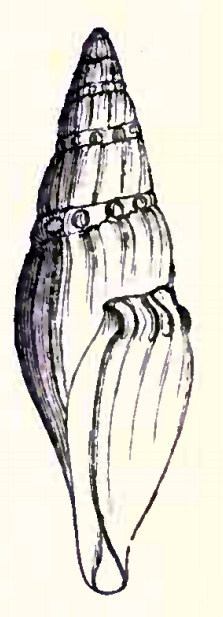
- Original drawing of a shell of Clionella costata

Scientific classification
- Kingdom: Animalia
- Phylum: Mollusca
- Class: Gastropoda
- Subclass: Caenogastropoda
- Order: Neogastropoda
- Superfamily: Conoidea
- Family: Clavatulidae
- Genus: Clionella
- Species: C. costata

Binomial name
- Clionella costata (Swainson, 1840)

Synonyms
- Melatoma costata Swainson, 1840

= Clionella costata =

Species of gastropod

Clionella costata is a species of sea snail, a marine gastropod mollusk in the family Clavatulidae.

== Description ==
(Original description) The shell has a fusiform shape and is longitudinally ribbed. There is a deep sinus at the top of the outer lip. The base is contracted. The siphonal canal is wide.

The figure of the type, produced by Swainson, shows a shell with a tapering base, unlike any other species of Clionella.
