= Clionella striolata =

Scientific classification
- Kingdom: Animalia
- Phylum: Mollusca
- Class: Gastropoda
- Subclass: Caenogastropoda
- Order: Neogastropoda
- Superfamily: Conoidea
- Family: Clavatulidae
- Genus: Clionella
- Species: C. striolata

Binomial name
- Clionella striolata Turton, 1932

Species of gastropod

Clionella striolata is a species of sea snail, a marine gastropod mollusk in the family Clavatulidae.

== Description ==
The size of an adult shell varies between 14 mm and 22 mm.

The squat, bucciniform shell has convex whorls and a rather large aperture. The siphonal canal is barely notched. The anal sinus is very shallow. The arcuate ribs number 14-19 per whorl, but becoming sometimes obsolete on later whorls. The color of the shell consists of patches of yellowish-brown.

Characteristic for this species is that the spiral sculpture shows 4–5 well-spaced grooves per whorl. Furthermore, the subsutural cord is feeble.

== Distribution ==
This marine species occurs in lower mid-tidal rock pools off Namaqualand to Cape Hangklip, South Africa.
