= Crassiclava omia =

Scientific classification
- Kingdom: Animalia
- Phylum: Mollusca
- Class: Gastropoda
- Subclass: Caenogastropoda
- Order: Neogastropoda
- Superfamily: Conoidea
- Family: Pseudomelatomidae
- Genus: Crassiclava
- Species: C. omia

Binomial name
- Crassiclava omia (Barnard, 1958)

Synonyms
- Drillia omia Barnard, 1958

Species of gastropod

Crassiclava omia is a species of sea snail, a marine gastropod mollusk in the family Pseudomelatomidae.

== Description ==
Thel length of the shell attains 9.8 mm, its diameter 4.2 mm.

== Distribution ==
This marine species occurs off Table Bay, South Africa.
