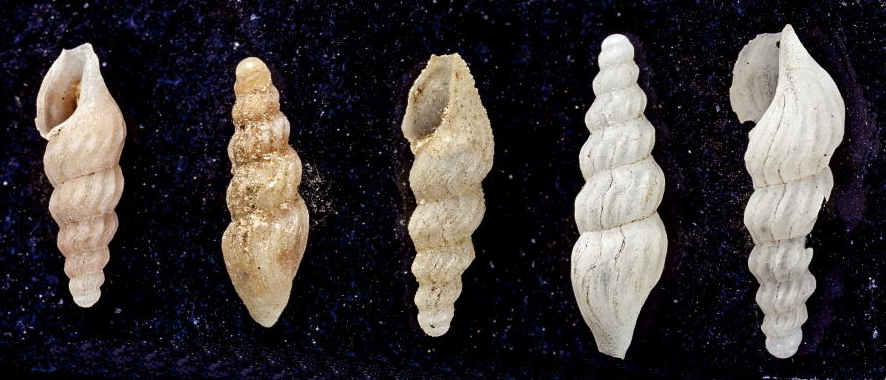
- Shell of Inodrillia prolongata (specimens at the Natural History Museum, London)

Scientific classification
- Kingdom: Animalia
- Phylum: Mollusca
- Class: Gastropoda
- Subclass: Caenogastropoda
- Order: Neogastropoda
- Superfamily: Conoidea
- Family: Horaiclavidae
- Genus: Inodrillia
- Species: I. prolongata

Binomial name
- Inodrillia prolongata (E. A. Smith, 1890)

Synonyms
- Clavus prolongata E.A. Smith, 1890; Pleurotoma (Clavus) prolongata E. A. Smith, 1890 (basionym)

= Inodrillia prolongata =

Species of gastropod

Inodrillia prolongata is a species of sea snail, a marine gastropod mollusk in the family Horaiclavidae.

It was previously included within the family Turridae.

== Description ==
The length of the shell attains 6 mm, its diameter 2 mm.

The elongated, turreted shell contains 6–7 whorls, of which two in the protoconch. This species is remarkable for the great length of the spire in proportion to that of the short aperture. Besides the 12 ribs, the surface exhibits fine wavy striae of growth. The inner lip is thin and slightly incrassate. The large sinus is deep. The columella is straight. The siphonal canal is wide and very short.

== Distribution ==
This marine species occurs off St. Helena
