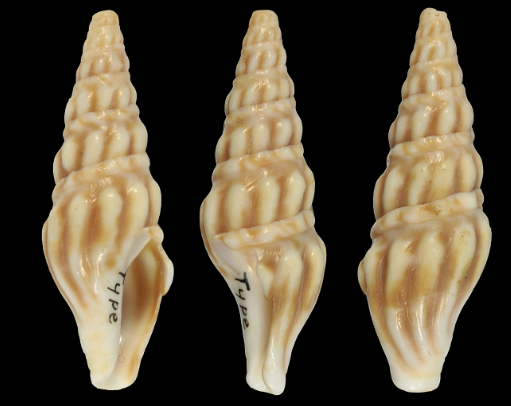
- Shell of Clionella halistrepta (holotype at the Smithsonian Institution)

Scientific classification
- Kingdom: Animalia
- Phylum: Mollusca
- Class: Gastropoda
- Subclass: Caenogastropoda
- Order: Neogastropoda
- Superfamily: Conoidea
- Family: Clavatulidae
- Genus: Clionella
- Species: C. halistrepta

Binomial name
- Clionella halistrepta (Bartsch, 1915)

Synonyms
- Clavatula halistrepta Bartsch, 1915 (basionym); Clavatula halistrepta var. albocincta W. H. Turton, 1932 (junior synonym); Clavatula hera W. H. Turton, 1932 (junior synonym); Crassiclava halistrepta (Bartsch, 1915)

= Clionella halistrepta =

Species of gastropod

Clionella halistrepta is a species of sea snail, a marine gastropod mollusk in the family Clavatulidae.

== Description ==
The size of the shell varies between 25 mm and 42 mm.

(Original description) The shell has a fusiform shape. The whorls are marked by a narrow, obscurely nodulous spiral keel at the summit, which is followed by a depressed spiral sulcus that equals the keel in width. The two comprise the posterior two-fifths of the whorls between the sutures. The anterior three-fifths are marked by strong, broad, low, rounded, slightly protractive axial ribs, which are strongest at their junction with the sulcus, beyond which they scarcely extend. The type has lost the early whorls; upon the first of those remaining there are 10 and upon the rest, 12 ribs. Intercostal spaces are about one-half as wide as the ribs. On account of the closely appressed summits, the sutures are poorly defined. The base of the body whorl is moderately long, marked by the continuations of the ribs, which gradually weaken in strength as they pass forward. The entire surface of the spire and base are marked by lines of growth and numerous, closely crowded, fine, wavy, spiral striations. The posterior angle of the aperture is acute, sinus below the keel at the summit. The sigmoid columella is covered by a thin callus which also extends over the parietal wall, in the posterior portion of which it becomes decidedly thickened. The ground color of the shell is cream yellow. The intercostal spaces and slight extensions of their areas posteriorly across the sulcus and the summit of the keel are chestnut brown. The same coloration appears within the aperture.

== Distribution ==
This marine species occurs off Jeffrey's Bay - East London, South Africa.
