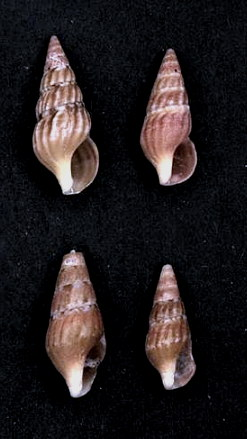
- A collection of shells of Clionella rosaria (museum specimens at Naturalis Biodiversity Center)

Scientific classification
- Kingdom: Animalia
- Phylum: Mollusca
- Class: Gastropoda
- Subclass: Caenogastropoda
- Order: Neogastropoda
- Superfamily: Conoidea
- Family: Clavatulidae
- Genus: Clionella
- Species: C. rosaria

Binomial name
- Clionella rosaria (Reeve, 1846)

Synonyms
- Clionella kowiensis Turton, 1932; Clionella kowiensis viridis (f) Turton, W.H., 1932; Clionella nereia Bartsch, P., 1915; Clionella rosaria f. kowiensis (Turton, 1932); Clionella proxima Turton, W.H., 1932; Clionella sybaritica Bartsch, P., 1915; Pleurotoma rosaria Reeve, 1846

= Clionella rosaria =

Species of gastropod

Clionella rosaria is a species of sea snail, a marine gastropod mollusk in the family Clavatulidae.

The forma Clionella rosaria f. kowiensis (Turton, 1932) is accepted as Clionella rosaria (Reeve, 1846)

== Description ==
The size of an adult shell varies between 15 mm and 23 mm. The shell is shortly subulate, truncated at the base. The whorls are plaited and smooth. The aperture is short. The color of the shell is bright scarlet-rose, the uppermost part of the whorls is white-zoned.

The shell has an elongate-conic shape. The nuclear whorls are decollated. The post-nuclear whorls are moderately rounded, constricted at the sinus, which causes the summit of the turns to appear as a cord. The space between the sutures is variously mottled with flesh color and chestnut spots and streaks. The base, beginning at the periphery, is rose colored, a little paler on the columella than the rest. The whorls are marked with strong, protractive, axial ribs, which are about as wide as the spaces that separate them. Of these, 14 occur upon the first to sixth whorl, while on the body whorl the number increases to about 20. These ribs are interrupted at the sinus a little distance below the summit, and become decidedly enfeebled on the base, vanishing before they reach the columella. In addition to the axial ribs the surface is marked by numerous strong lines of growth. The spiral sculpture consists of equal and equally spaced spiral striations, which are about as broad as the spaces that separate them; these are best expressed in the groove of the sinus. The lirae, between the spiral striations and the axial lines of growth, inclose numerous small pits, giving the entire surface between the sutures the appearance of a grating. On the base the lines of growth are less strongly developed and the pitting is less pronounced. The aperture is rather short. The posterior angle is obtuse. The sinus is about as broad as the cord above it at the summit of the whorls. The space between the sinus and the anterior portion of the outer lip forms a claw-like element. The columella is strong, its inner edge, like the parietal wall, is glazed with a thin callus.

== Distribution ==
This marine species occurs from False Bay to South KwaZuluNatal, South Africa
