= Clionella vilma =

Scientific classification
- Kingdom: Animalia
- Phylum: Mollusca
- Class: Gastropoda
- Subclass: Caenogastropoda
- Order: Neogastropoda
- Superfamily: Conoidea
- Family: Clavatulidae
- Genus: Clionella
- Species: C. vilma

Binomial name
- Clionella vilma (Thiele, 1925)

Synonyms
- Crassispira agulhasensis Thiele, J., 1925 (doubtful synonym); Pleurotoma vilma Thiele, 1925

Species of gastropod

Clionella vilma is a species of sea snail, a marine gastropod mollusk in the family Clavatulidae.

== Description ==
The length of the shell attains 28 mm.

The narrow shell has a high spire with evenly convex whorls and a small aperture with a shallow siphonal canal. The shell lacks a subsutural cord or a shoulder sulcus. The axial ribs (numbering 12–22 per whorl) are crossed by fine, close spiral threads. The ground colour of the shell shows various shades of orange

== Distribution ==
This marine species occurs off the Agulhas Bank, South Africa.
