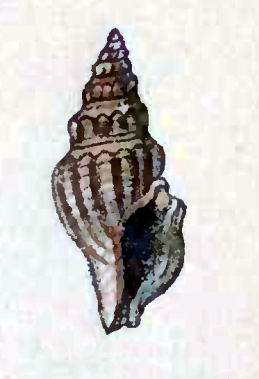
- Apertural view of a shell of Crassispira apicata

Scientific classification
- Kingdom: Animalia
- Phylum: Mollusca
- Class: Gastropoda
- Subclass: Caenogastropoda
- Order: Neogastropoda
- Superfamily: Conoidea
- Family: Pseudomelatomidae
- Genus: Crassispira
- Species: C. apicata

Binomial name
- Crassispira apicata (Reeve, 1845)

Synonyms
- Crassiclava apicata Reeve, 1845; Pleurotoma apicata Reeve, 1845

= Crassispira apicata =

Species of gastropod

Crassispira apicata is a species of sea snail, a marine gastropod mollusk in the family Pseudomelatomidae.

== Description ==
The length of the shell varies between 7 mm and 20 mm.

The whorls are concavely flattened above a fine keel, nodosely plaited beneath, plaits fading away towards the lower part. Transversely the shell is impressly striated. The color of the shell is chocolate brown or pale yellow, reddish at the apex.

== Distribution ==
This marine species occurs from Colombia to Northern Brazil; also off the Virgin Islands.; fossils have been found in Early Pliocene strata of Venezuela.
