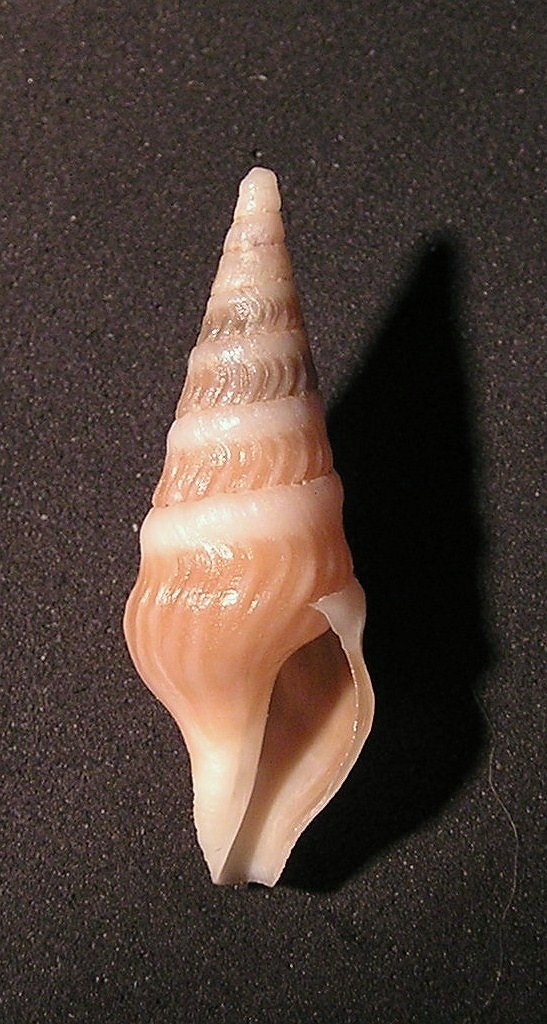
- Apertural view of a shell of Toxiclionella haliplex

Scientific classification
- Kingdom: Animalia
- Phylum: Mollusca
- Class: Gastropoda
- Subclass: Caenogastropoda
- Order: Neogastropoda
- Superfamily: Conoidea
- Family: Clavatulidae
- Genus: Toxiclionella
- Species: T. haliplex

Binomial name
- Toxiclionella haliplex (Bartsch, 1915)

Synonyms
- Clavatula haliplex Bartsch, 1915

= Toxiclionella haliplex =

Species of gastropod

Toxiclionella haliplex is a species of sea snail, a marine gastropod mollusk in the family Clavatulidae.

== Description ==
The shell grows to a length of 40 mm.

(Original description) The robust shell is fusiform. The whorls slope from the summit and the periphery to a depressed line midway between the sutures. The portion posterior to the median line is smooth excepting the strongly retractive lines of growth and spiral striations. The portion anterior to it is marked by distant, low, broad, feebly developed axial ribs, which appear as nodules above the sulcus. On this part the incremental lines are decidedly protractive. The sutures are well marked. The posterior portion of base is well rounded, anterior part is produced rendering the left outline of the whorl concave, marked by feeble extensions of the ribs which disappear shortly after passing over the periphery. The entire surface of the spire and base are marked by very fine, closely spaced wavy spiral striations. The aperture has an irregular outline;. The posterior angle is acute. The sinus is moderately deep, in the middle between the periphery and the summit;. The columella is stout, somewhat sinuous and twisted, covered by a thin callus, which also extends over the parietal wall. The color of the shell is uniformly cream yellow. In some of the young specimens the space between the sulcus and the summit and the tip of base are white, the rest light brown.

== Distribution ==
This marine species occurs off Transkei and the Eastern Cape, South Africa.
