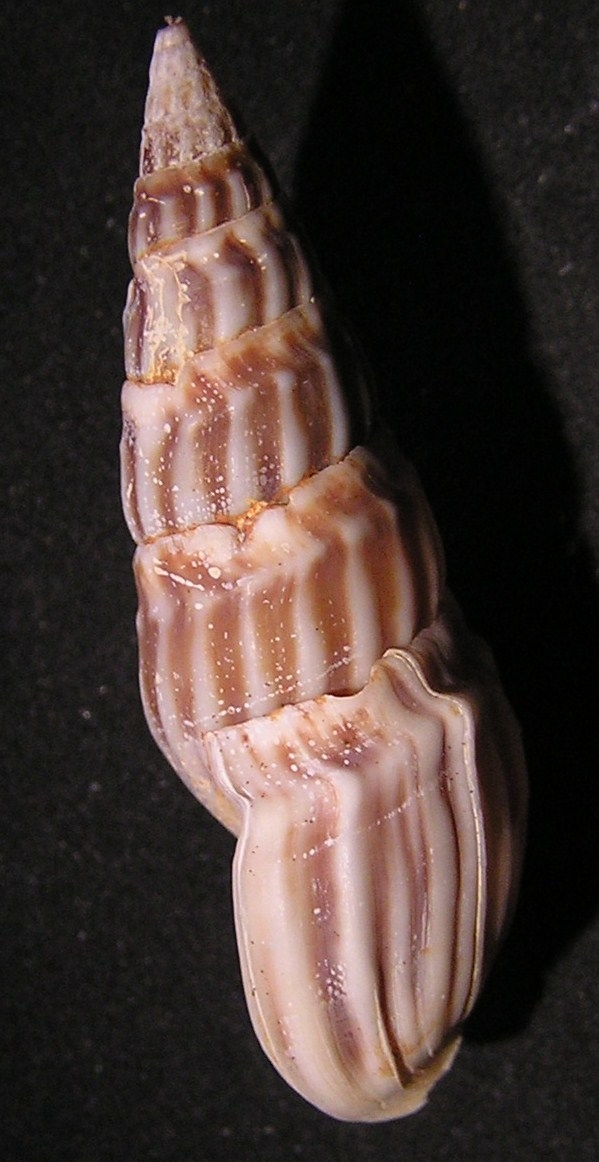
- Shell of Clionella sinuata

Scientific classification
- Kingdom: Animalia
- Phylum: Mollusca
- Class: Gastropoda
- Subclass: Caenogastropoda
- Order: Neogastropoda
- Superfamily: Conoidea
- Family: Clavatulidae
- Genus: Clionella
- Species: C. sinuata

Binomial name
- Clionella sinuata (Born, 1778)

Synonyms
- Buccinum phallus Gmelin, J.F., 1791; Buccinum sinuatum Born, 1778 (original combination); Clavatula sinuata (Born, 1778); Clionella sinuata sinuata (Born, 1778); Clionella sinuatum (Born, 1778) (wrong gender agreement of specific epithet); Pleurotoma buccinoides Lamarck, 1822; Strombus boletus Röding, P.F., 1798; Terebra phallus Bosc, 1801

= Clionella sinuata =

Species of gastropod

Clionella sinuata, common name the ribbed turrid, is a species of sea snail, a marine gastropod mollusk in the family Clavatulidae.

Fossils of this species have been reported from Pleistocene localities on the west coast of South Africa.

== Description ==
The size of an adult shell varies between 30 mm and 45 mm.

The shell is variable in shape. The spire varies from high to relatively low. The whorls are not distinctly concave and have a narrow channel above. The subsutural cord is somewhat impressed. The axial ribs are going from strong (numbering 18-25 per whorl) to almost obsolete. The periphery contains a row of small nodules produced by the anal sinus, terminating short, low, flexuous plicate ribs. The spiral striae are not very distinct. The color of the shell is a pale rusty brown to brownish orange, under a blackish brown epidermis.

== Distribution ==
This marine species occurs off the west coast of Namibia and South Africa.
