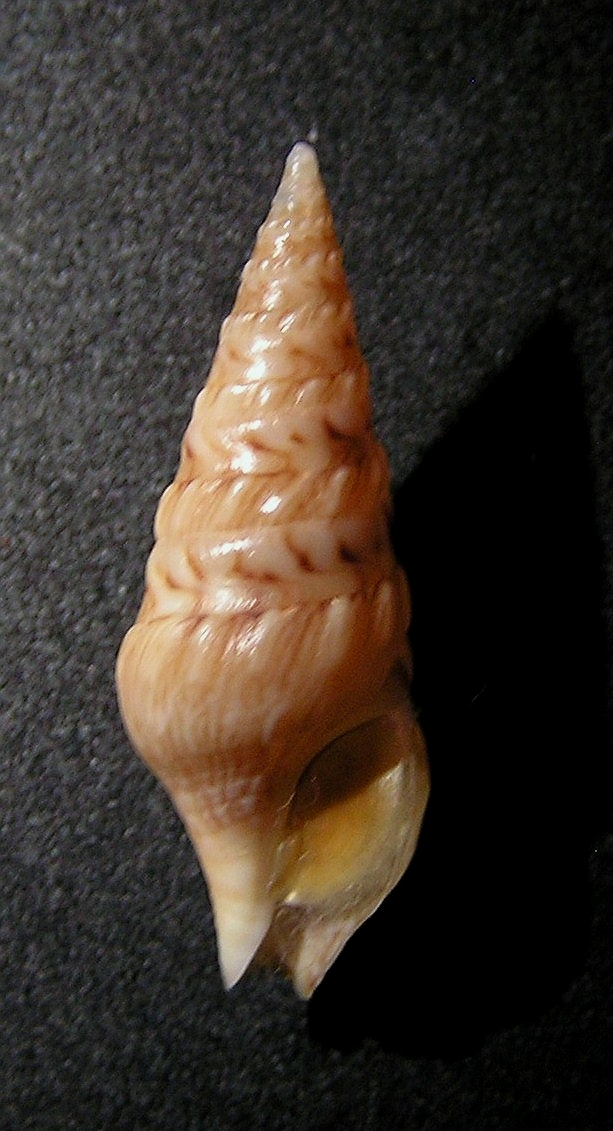
- Apertural view of Clavatula tripartita

Scientific classification
- Kingdom: Animalia
- Phylum: Mollusca
- Class: Gastropoda
- Subclass: Caenogastropoda
- Order: Neogastropoda
- Superfamily: Conoidea
- Family: Clavatulidae
- Genus: Clavatula
- Species: C. tripartita

Binomial name
- Clavatula tripartita (Weinkauff & Kobelt, 1876)

Synonyms
- Clavatula (Clionella) bipartita Smith E.A., 187; Clavatula (Perrona) obesa Reeve, 1884; Clavatula parilis Smith, E.A., 1901; Clionella assimilans Turton, W.H., 1932; Clionella bipartita Smith, E.A., 1877; Clionella tripartita (Weinkauff & Kobelt, 1876); Pleurotoma (Clionella) bipartita E. A. Smith, 1877 (typographical error for tripartita); Pleurotoma (Clavatula) tripartita Weinkauff & Kobelt, 1876 (basionym)

= Clavatula tripartita =

Species of gastropod

Clavatula tripartita is a species of sea snail, a marine gastropod mollusk in the family Clavatulidae.

== Description ==
The size of an adult shell varies between 26 mm and 45 mm.

== Distribution ==
This marine species occurs from Jeffrey's Bay, South Africa to Mozambique.
