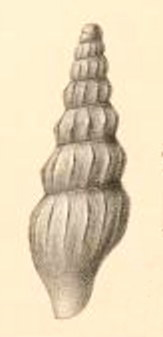
- Original drawing of a shell of Inodrillia nucleata

Scientific classification
- Kingdom: Animalia
- Phylum: Mollusca
- Class: Gastropoda
- Subclass: Caenogastropoda
- Order: Neogastropoda
- Superfamily: Conoidea
- Family: Horaiclavidae
- Genus: Inodrillia
- Species: I. nucleata

Binomial name
- Inodrillia nucleata (Dall, 1881)

Synonyms
- Clionella amblia R.B. Watson, 1882; Pleurotoma (Drillia) nucleata Dall, 1881

= Inodrillia nucleata =

Species of gastropod

Inodrillia nucleata is a species of sea snail, a marine gastropod mollusk in the family Horaiclavidae.

It was previously included within the family Turridae.

== Description ==
The length of the shell attains 13.5 mm, its diameter 5 mm.

(Original description) The shell is polished, waxy white and contains seven or eight whorls. The white, protoconch is disproportionately large, smooth at first, shining, very obtuse. The second whorl shows about fifteen rather sharp transverse ridges parallel with the axis, and not flexuous. These pass gradually into slightly oblique, rounded riblets, which begin in front of the notch-band with a slight shoulder, then continue across the whorl, and are somewhat attenuated by the time they reach the suture. Of these there are about fifteen on the body whorl, less distinct anteriorly. The lines of growth are tolerably prominent, and especially so on the body whorl. Of the revolving sculpture there is little or none. A few microscopic revolving striae are perceptible in some places, especially on the surface of the rather broad notch-band. The suture is appressed. The shouldering of the riblets gives the upper whorls a rather inflated appearance. The aperture is short and wide. The notch is deep, with its edges turned up and a little twisted. The siphonal canal is short, wide, slightly reflected, showing on the columella a distinct fasciole. The columella is straight, with a distinct callus upon it and also upon the body whorl. The outer lip is thin-edged, produced and rounded.

== Distribution ==
This marine species occurs off East Florida, the Florida Keys, USA, and off Cuba
