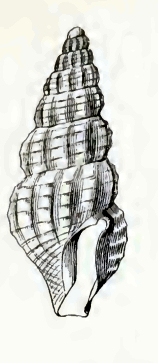
- Original image of a shell of Inodrillia pharcida

Scientific classification
- Kingdom: Animalia
- Phylum: Mollusca
- Class: Gastropoda
- Subclass: Caenogastropoda
- Order: Neogastropoda
- Superfamily: Conoidea
- Family: Horaiclavidae
- Genus: Inodrillia
- Species: I. pharcida

Binomial name
- Inodrillia pharcida (Dall, 1889)

Synonyms
- Drillia pharcida W.H. Dall, 1889; Pleurotoma (Drillia) exasperata Dall, 1881

= Inodrillia pharcida =

Species of gastropod

Inodrillia pharcida is a species of sea snail, a marine gastropod mollusc in the family Horaiclavidae.

It was within Turridae.

== Description ==
The length of the shell attains 9.5 mm, its diameter 3.5 mm.

(Original description) The slender, thin shell is yellowish-white, with a dull surface, except for the glassy and translucent protoconch. It contains 8 whorls. The protoconch is thin, inflated, the (nuclear) first two whorls) polished, smooth, and free from sculpture, passing abruptly into the dull and lustreless surface of the adult shell. For the remainder, the transverse sculpture consists of subequal rils, largest on the periphery, smaller toward the sutures, which they reach above and below, the track of the notch not being marked by a flattened band, as is generally the case. There are about eleven of these to a whorl, on the body whorl they are less pronounced, and become obsolete toward the anterior third of the whorl, where the lines of growth are particularly conspicuous. The completion of the adult aperture is marked by a particularly large rib or swelling of the margin, which becomes more conspicuous in case the shell continues to grow. In the older part of the shell the ribs are continued in the same line from whorl to whorl, in the body whorl and a half they become alternate or irregular. The revolving sculpture consists of (on the smaller whorls) two or three to (on the body whorl) sixteen flattened raised bands, with wider interspaces, which are much more marked, or even knobby, on the smaller whorls where they pass over the transverse ribs, gradually become more uniform, and, on the last whorl, are nearly as well defined between the ribs as on them. Nine of those on the body whorl are crowded together on the anterior third, the rest spread over the body of the whorl. There are hardly any traces of revolving striation. The notch is deep, but not producing a band. The margin of the aperture is thin. The outer lip is produced forward, a slight deposit on the body and the columella. The columella is nearly straight, slightly shorter than the rather wide, somewhat recurved siphonal canal . The sutures are appressed, sinuous over the ends of the transverse ribs. The aperture measures less than one third of the shell.

== Distribution ==
This marine species occurs in the Gulf of Mexico and Barbados
