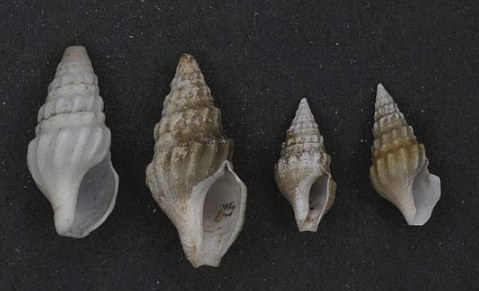
- Four shells of Clionella semicostata (museum specimens at Naturalis Biodiversity Center)

Scientific classification
- Kingdom: Animalia
- Phylum: Mollusca
- Class: Gastropoda
- Subclass: Caenogastropoda
- Order: Neogastropoda
- Superfamily: Conoidea
- Family: Clavatulidae
- Genus: Clionella
- Species: C. semicostata

Binomial name
- Clionella semicostata (Kiener, 1840)

Synonyms
- Clavatula semicostata (Kiener, 1840); Drillia halidoma Bartsch, P., 1915; Pleurotoma nux Reeve, L.A., 1845; Pleurotoma semicostata Kiener, 1840 (original combination); Pleurotoma sigillata Reeve, L.A., 1846; Pleurotoma (Clionella) sigillata Weinkauff, 1876

= Clionella semicostata =

Species of gastropod

Clionella semicostata is a species of sea snail, a marine gastropod mollusk in the family Clavatulidae.

== Description ==
The size of an adult shell varies between 15 mm and 32 mm. The whorls are with shallow channel above. The shoulder angle is situated above or at the middle of the whorl. The body whorl has an obconical shape. The yellowish-brown to dark brown periphery of the shell is nodulous by the terminations of short, oblique, rather distant axial ribs (numbering 12-14). The spiral striae are faint to distinct. The anal sinus is broad. The color of the shell is a uniform light yellowish brown.

== Distribution ==
This marine species occurs from False Bay to Cape Agulhas, South Africa
