= Belomitridae =

Scientific classification
- Kingdom: Animalia
- Phylum: Mollusca
- Class: Gastropoda
- Subclass: Caenogastropoda
- Order: Neogastropoda
- Superfamily: Buccinoidea
- Family: Belomitridae; Kantor, Puillandre, Rivasseau & Bouchet, 2012

Type genus
- Belomitra P. Fischer, 1883

Genera
- See text

Family of large sea snails

The Belomitridae are a taxonomic family of large sea snails, often known as whelks.

== Genera ==
- Belomitra P. Fischer, 1883

Genera brought into synonymy

- Bathyclionella Kobelt, 1905: synonym of Belomitra P. Fischer, 1883 (junior subjective synonym)
- Cryptomitra Dall, 1924: synonym of Belomitra P. Fischer, 1883 (junior subjective synonym)
- Dellina Beu, 1970: synonym of Belomitra P. Fischer, 1883 (junior subjective synonym)
- Morrisonella Bartsch, 1945: synonym of Belomitra P. Fischer, 1883 (junior subjective synonym)
- Pleurobela Monterosato [in Locard], 1897: synonym of Belomitra P. Fischer, 1883
