= Tomella =

Scientific classification
- Kingdom: Animalia
- Phylum: Mollusca
- Class: Gastropoda
- Subclass: Caenogastropoda
- Order: Neogastropoda
- Family: Clavatulidae
- Genus: Tomella; Swainson, 1840

Type species
- Clavatula lineata Lamarck, 1816

Genus of gastropods

Tomella is a genus of sea snails, marine gastropod mollusks in the family Clavatulidae.

This name is no longer valid as it is a junior homonym of Tomella Robineau-Desvoidy, 1830 (order Diptera). It has been replaced by Tomellana (Wenz, 1943).

== Species ==
Species brought into synonymy

- Tomella hupferi Strebel, 1912: synonym of Tomellana hupferi (Strebel, 1912)
- Tomella leschkei Strebel, 1912: synonym of Tomellana leschkei (Strebel, 1912)
- Tomella pfefferi Strebel, 1912: synonym of Clavatula pfefferi (Strebel, 1912)
