= P. compacta =

P. compacta may refer to:

- Paracercomonas compacta, a rhizaria species
- Partula compacta, an extinct gastropod species endemic to French Polynesia
- Protea compacta, a plant species
- Pusionella compacta, a sea snail species
- Puya compacta, a plant species endemic to Ecuador

== See also ==
- Compacta (disambiguation)
