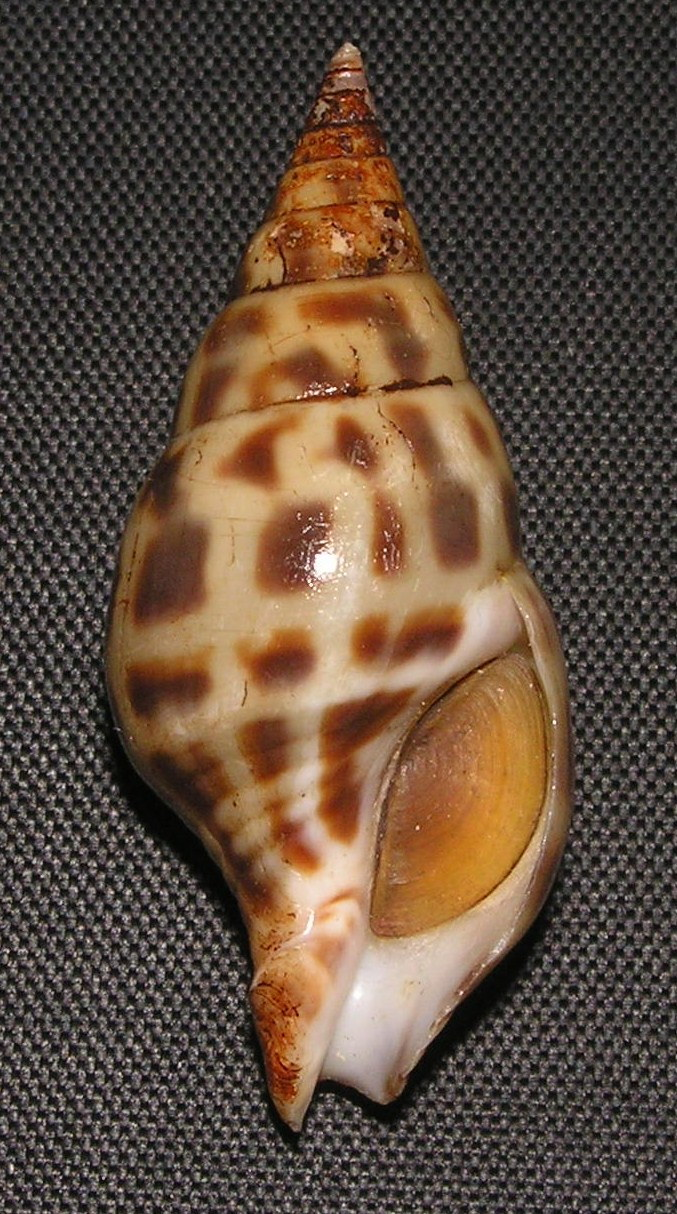
- Apertural view of a shell of Pusionella nifat

Scientific classification
- Kingdom: Animalia
- Phylum: Mollusca
- Class: Gastropoda
- Subclass: Caenogastropoda
- Order: Neogastropoda
- Superfamily: Conoidea
- Family: Clavatulidae
- Genus: Pusionella; Gray, 1847

Type species
- Buccinum nifat Bruguière, 1789

Synonyms
- Netrum Philippi, 1850 (invalid: junior objective synonym of Pusionella)

= Pusionella =

Genus of gastropods

Pusionella is a genus of sea snails, marine gastropod mollusks in the family Clavatulidae.

== Description ==
The fusiform shell is solid, smooth and shining, with numerous whorls. The spire is sharp. The lip lacks an anal sinus. The siphonal canal is short, and exteriorly carinated at the base. The columella is twisted anteriorly. The operculum has a lateral nucleus. The eyes are located at the external bases of the tentacles.

== Distribution ==
This genus occurs off the western coast of Africa.

== Species ==
Species within the genus Pusionella include:

- Pusionella buccinata (Lamarck, 1822)
- Pusionella compacta Strebel, 1914
- Pusionella ghanaensis Boyer & Ryall, 2006
- Pusionella lirata Adams A., 1853
- Pusionella lupinus (Philippi, 1850)
- Pusionella nifat (Bruguiere, 1789)
- † Pusionella pseudofusus (Desmoulins, 1842) (fossil in depositis from the Miocene, Burdigalian, Graves near Bordeaux, France)
- Pusionella rapulum Tryon, 1884
- Pusionella remorata Sykes, 1905
- Pusionella valida (Dunker, 1852)
- Pusionella vulpina (Born, 1780)

Species brought into synonymy

- Pusionella aculeiformis (Lamarck, 1822): synonym of Perrona aculeiformis (Lamarck, 1816)
- Pusionella albocincta (Petit de la Saussaye, 1851): synonym of Pusionella nifat (Bruguière, 1789)
- Pusionella catelini (Petit de la Saussaye, 1851) accepted as Perrona aculeiformis (Lamarck, 1816)
- Pusionella grandis A. Adams, 1853 : synonym of Pusionella valida (Dunker, 1852)
- Pusionella haasi Dautzenberg, 1912: synonym of Pusionella valida (Dunker, 1852)
- Pusionella kraepelini Strebel, 1914: synonym of Clavatula kraepelini (Strebel, 1914)
- Pusionella milleti milleti (Petit de la Saussaye, 1851) : synonym of Clavatula milleti (Petit de la Saussaye, 1851)
- Pusionella milleti subgranulatus (Petit de la Saussaye, 1851): synonym of Clavatula milleti (Petit de la Saussaye, 1851)
- Pusionella rafel Pallary, P., 1920: synonym of Pusionella vulpina (Born, 1780)
- Pusionella recurvirostris Marrat, 1877 accepted as Pusionella aculeiformis (Lamarck, 1816) accepted as Perrona aculeiformis (Lamarck, 1816)
- Pusionella scripta Nordsieck, 1975: synonym of Mitrella broderipi (G.B. Sowerby I, 1844)
- Pusionella testabilis Jousseaume, 1896: synonym of Daphnella rissoides (Reeve, 1843)
