= Jessica =

Jessica may refer to:

== Given name ==
- Jessica (given name), includes a list of people and fictional characters with this name
- Jessica Folcker, a Swedish singer known by the mononym Jessica
- Jessica Jung, a Korean-American singer known by the mononym Jessica, former member of the South Korean girl group Girls' Generation
- Jessica (The Merchant of Venice), a character in Shakespeare's play

== Animals ==
- Jessica (spider), a genus of spiders
- Catocala jessica, a moth of the Noctuidae superfamily, described from Arizona through Colorado to Illinois and California
- Perrona jessica, a species of sea snail, a marine gastropod mollusk in the family Clavatulidae

== Arts, entertainment, and media ==
=== Albums ===
- Jessica (Gerald Wilson album), 1983
- Jessica (sv), 1998 debut album by Swedish singer Jessica Folcker

=== Songs ===
- "Jessica" (instrumental), a 1973 song by the Allman Brothers Band
- "Jessica" (Elliot Minor song), a 2007 song by English band Elliot Minor
- "Jessica", a 2001 single by Dir En Grey from the album Kisō
- "Jessica", a song by Adam Green
- "Jessica", a song by Down with Webster
- "Jessica", a song by Herbie Hancock originally on the album Fat Albert Rotunda
- "Jessica", a song by Major Lazer featuring Ezra Koenig on the Major Lazer album Free the Universe
- "Jessica", a song by The Beau Brummels on the album Bradley's Barn
- "Jessica", a song by Seals and Crofts on the album Diamond Girl
- "Jessica", a song by Israeli band Ethnix and Yevgeni Shapovalov
- "Jessica", a song by Avi Buffalo on their self-titled debut album
- "Jessica", a song by Regina Spektor

=== Other uses in arts, entertainment, and media ===
- Jessica (film), a 1962 film with Maurice Chevalier and Angie Dickinson
- Jessica (miniseries), directed by Peter Andrikidis, based on the 1998 novel
- Jessica (novel), by Bryce Courtenay 1998
- Jessica (painting), an 1890 painting by Dennis Miller Bunker

== Other uses ==
- Joint European Support for Sustainable Investment in City Areas, an initiative of the European Investment Bank
- MV Jessica, an oil tanker that spilled 568 tons of oil off the coast of the Galapagos Islands

== See also ==
- Baby Jessica case, a well-publicized custody battle in Ann Arbor, Michigan in the early 1990s
- Jessica's Law, a Florida law to punish child predators
- Iscah, daughter of Haran in the Bible (Genesis 11:27, 29), speculated to be the source of the name 'Jessica'
- Jessika (disambiguation)
- Jessicka (disambiguation)
