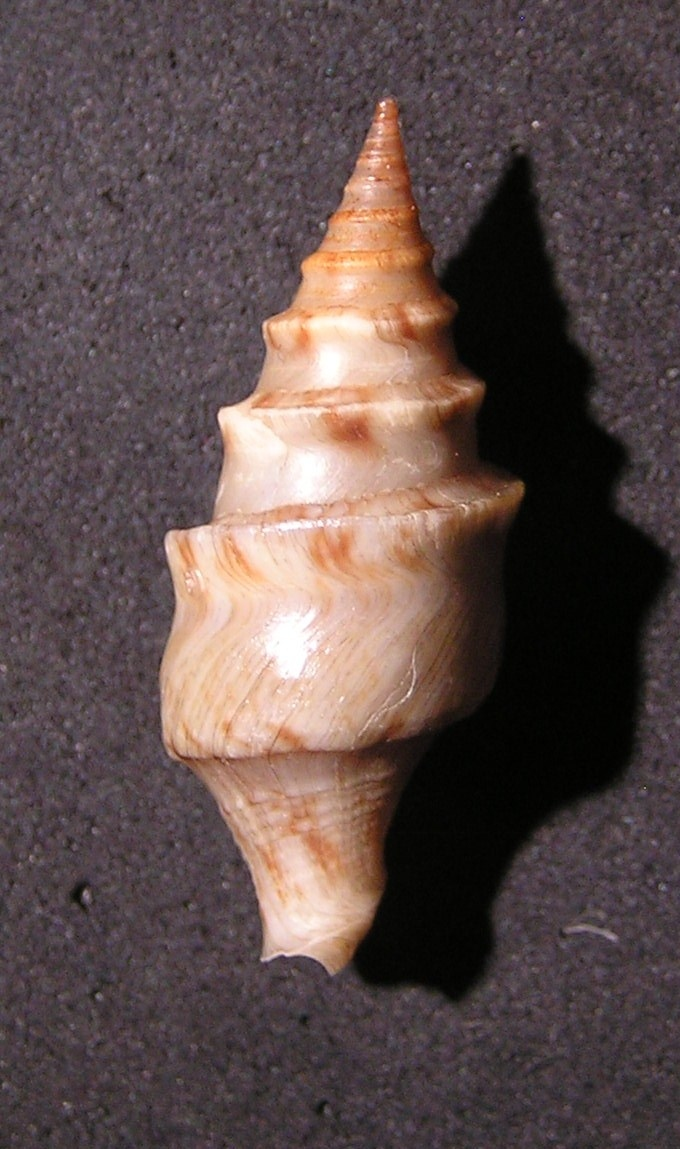
- A shell of Perrona spirata

Scientific classification
- Kingdom: Animalia
- Phylum: Mollusca
- Class: Gastropoda
- Subclass: Caenogastropoda
- Order: Neogastropoda
- Superfamily: Conoidea
- Family: Clavatulidae
- Genus: Perrona; Schumacher, 1817

Type species
- Perrona tritonum Schumacher, 1817

Synonyms
- Clavatula (Perrona) Schumacher, 1817; † Perrona (Perrona) Schumacher, 1817; Pleurotoma (Perrona) Schumacher, 1817

= Perrona =

Genus of gastropods

Perrona is a genus of sea snails, marine gastropod mollusks in the family Clavatulidae.

== Description ==
In this genus the spire is carinated or smooth. The whorls are not tubercular or spinose. The anal sinus can be found more or less near the suture.

The smooth shell is fusiform. The spire is short with few whorls. The aperture is narrow. The siphonal canal is long. The outer lip shows a wide shallow sinus near the middle. The inner lip has a thick callosity at the hind part near the suture.

The species of Perrona are smooth and solid shells with a notch in the middle of the outer lip. The hind part of the body whorl is gibbous, and the columella, as in that genus, is callous posteriorly.

== Species ==
Species within the genus Perrona include:

- Perrona aculeiformis (Lamarck, 1816)
- † Perrona anwari Abbass H., 1977
- † Perrona barbarae (R. Hoernes & Auinger, 1891)
- † Perrona czarnockii Bałuk, 2003
- † Perrona descendens (Hilber, 1879)
- † Perrona eleonorae (R. Hoernes & Auinger, 1891)
- † Perrona emmae (R. Hoernes & Auinger, 1891)
- † Perrona ernae (Šuklje, 1929)
- † Perrona estebbunensis Vera-Peláez & Lozano-Francisco, 2001
- † Perrona floriana (Hilber, 1879)
- † Perrona grossi Harzhauser, Landau & R. Janssen, 2022
- † Perrona heinmoorensis Kautsky, 1925
- † Perrona herculea (Mayer-Eymar, 1886) †
- † Perrona ilonae Harzhauser, Landau & R. Janssen, 2022
- Perrona jessica Melvill, 1923 (taxon inquirendum)
- † Perrona koeberli Harzhauser, Landau & R. Janssen, 2022
- † Perrona loetschi Harzhauser, Landau & R. Janssen, 2022
- † Perrona louisae (R. Hoernes & Auinger, 1891)
- † Perrona lydiae (R. Hoernes & Auinger, 1891)
- Perrona micro Rolan, Ryall & Horro, 2008
- † Perrona munizsolisi Vera-Peláez & Lozano-Francisco, 2001
- † Perrona nudata (K. Martin, 1935)
- † Perrona obeliscoides (Millet, 1854)
- Perrona obesa (Reeve, 1842)
- † Perrona oliviae (R. Hoernes & Auinger, 1891)
- Perrona perron (Gmelin, 1791)
- † Perrona pretiosa (Bellardi, 1847)
- Perrona quinteni (Nolf & Verstraeten, 2006)
- † Perrona robustocarinifera Landau, Harzhauser, İslamoğlu & Silva, 2013
- † Perrona rosaliae (R. Hoernes & Auinger, 1891)
- † Perrona sabinae (R. Hoernes & Auinger, 1891)
- † Perrona secunda Lozouet, 2017
- † Perrona servata (Sacco, 1890)
- Perrona spirata (Lamarck, 1816)
- † Perrona styriaca (Hilber, 1879)
- Perrona subspirata (Martens, 1902)
- † Perrona unisulcata (Cossmann, 1900) †
- † Perrona ursulae (R. Hoernes & Auinger, 1891)
- † Perrona villarrasensis Vera-Peláez & Lozano-Francisco, 2001
- † Perrona vindobonensis (Quenstedt, 1884)
- † Perrona wanzenboecki Harzhauser, Landau & R. Janssen, 2022

Species brought into synonymy

- † Perrona harzhauseri Kovács & Vicián, 2021: synonym of † Neoperrona harzhauseri (Z. Kovács & Vicián, 2021)
- † Perrona inedita (Bellardi, 1877): synonym of † Clavatula inedita Bellardi, 1877
- † Perrona letkesensis (Csepreghy-Meznerics, 1953): synonym of † Perrona emmae (R. Hoernes & Auinger, 1891) (junior subjective synonym)
- Perrona lineata (Lamarck, 1816): synonym of Tomellana lineata (Lamarck, 1818)
- † Perrona nemethi Kovács & Vicián, 2021: synonym of † Megaclavatula nemethi (Z. Kovács & Vicián, 2021)
- † Perrona semimarginata (Lamarck, 1822) (fossils from deposits in the Miocene, Burdigalian, Graves near Bordeaux, France): synonym of † Tomellana semimarginata (Lamarck, 1822)
- † Perrona taurinensis (Bellardi, 1877): synonym of † Neoperrona taurinensis (Bellardi, 1877)
- Perrona tritonum Schumacher, 1817: synonym of Perrona perron (Gmelin, 1791)

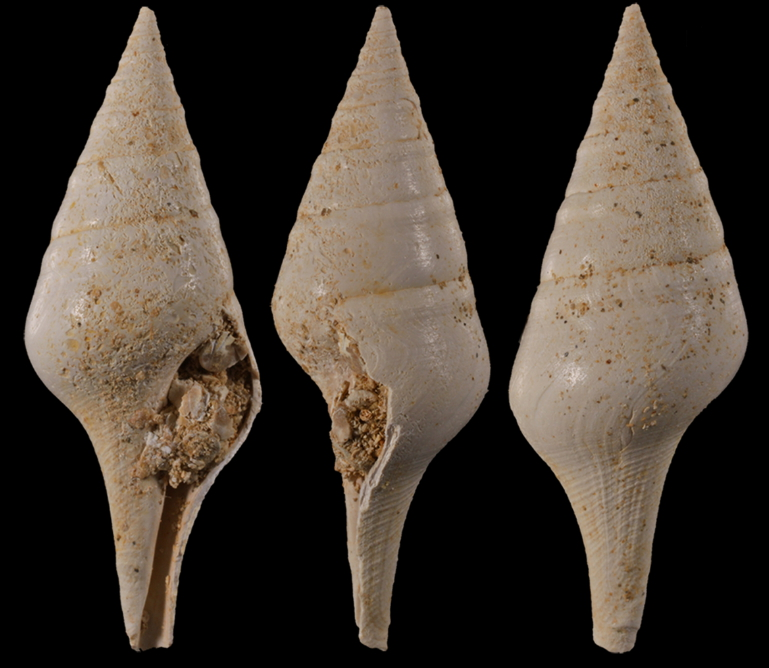
Several shells of † Perrona secunda
