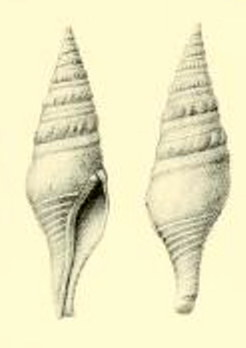
- Original drawing with two views of a shell of Fusiturris amianta

Scientific classification
- Kingdom: Animalia
- Phylum: Mollusca
- Class: Gastropoda
- Subclass: Caenogastropoda
- Order: Neogastropoda
- Superfamily: Conoidea
- Family: Fusiturridae
- Genus: Fusiturris
- Species: F. amianta

Binomial name
- Fusiturris amianta (Dautzenberg, 1912)

Synonyms
- Pleurotoma amianta Dautzenberg, 1912

= Fusiturris amianta =

Species of gastropod

Fusiturris amianta is a species of sea snail, a marine gastropod mollusk in the family Fusiturridae.

Subspecies

- Fusiturris amianta amianta (Dautzenberg, 1912)
- Fusiturris amianta procera Bozzetti, 2015

== Description ==
The size of an adult shell varies between 20 mm and 40 mm.

(Translated from the French original description) The solid, shiny shell has an extended fusiform shape. The high, turreted spire consists of 11 almost flat whorls (the first one is missing). They show at their top an angular keel and at the bottom a large bead with obliquely lined nodules. They are limited at the top by clear decurrent striae. The nodular folds disappear on the third part of the penultimate whorl, and there exists no traceof them on the body whorl. The surface is decorated with barely visible sigmoid growth lines. The body whorl occupies half the height tor of the shell. At its base is a long, barely notched siphonal canal. It shows below and on its back some fifteen furrows that fade gradually away. The oval aperture is elongated and angular at its top. The columella is almost perpendicular. It is barely twisted toward the base of the siphonal canal and topped with a thin, shiny callus. The outer lip is sinuated. The ground color of the shell is a white uniform ivory.

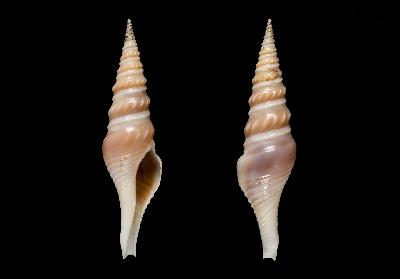
Fusiturris amianta procera (holotype in the MNHN, Paris

== Distribution ==
This species occurs in the Atlantic Ocean off Gabon.

== Bibliography ==
- Bernard, P.A. (Ed.) (1984). Coquillages du Gabon [Shells of Gabon]. Pierre A. Bernard: Libreville, Gabon. 140, 75 plates pp.
