= Jessica Bradley =

Jessica Bradley may refer to:

== Canadians ==
- Jessica Bradley (curator), a museum curator (born 1948)
- Jessica Bradley (politician), a politician (born 1988)
- Jessica Bradley, a mixed-martial arts champion

== Fictional characters ==
- Jessica Bradley, a Vought executive in The Boys
  - Jessica "Sage" Bradley, a superhero television character based on Jess Bradley
- Jess Bradley, the protagonist of Charlie, the Lonesome Cougar

== See also ==
- Jessica
- Bradley (surname)
