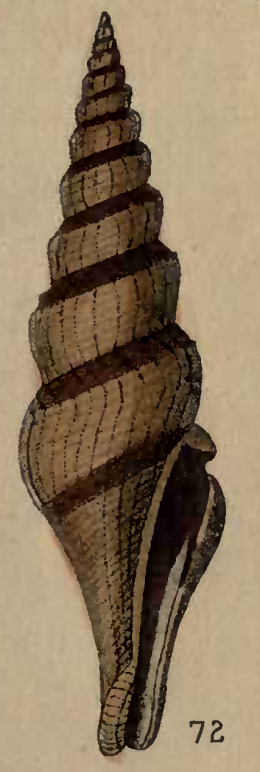
- Drawing of a shell of Fusiturris undatiruga

Scientific classification
- Kingdom: Animalia
- Phylum: Mollusca
- Class: Gastropoda
- Subclass: Caenogastropoda
- Order: Neogastropoda
- Superfamily: Conoidea
- Family: Fusiturridae
- Genus: Fusiturris
- Species: F. undatiruga

Binomial name
- Fusiturris undatiruga (Bivona Ant. in Bivona And., 1838)

Synonyms
- Pleurotoma balteata Kiener, L.C., 1840; Pleurotoma undatiruga Bivona Ant. in Bivona And., 1838 (basionym); Surcula undatiruga Bivona, 1838; Turris undatiruga Bivona

= Fusiturris undatiruga =

Species of gastropod

Fusiturris undatiruga, common name the wrinkled turrid, is a species of sea snail, a marine gastropod mollusk in the family Fusiturridae.

== Description ==
The size of an adult shell varies between 20 mm and 65 mm. The diameter is 16 mm. The whorls are angulated in the middle and nodulous on the angle. Above it, the surface is smooth; below the nodules, they are continued as flexuose wrinkles or ribs, becoming evanescent towards the base of the aperture. The color of the shell is yellowish brown, with usually one or two darker bands.

== Distribution ==
This species occurs in the Mediterranean Sea and the Atlantic Ocean off the Canaries, Gabon and Angola.

== Bibliography ==
- Gofas, S.; Afonso, J.P.; Brandào, M. (Ed.). (S.a.). Conchas e Moluscos de Angola = Coquillages et Mollusques d'Angola. [Shells and molluscs of Angola]. Universidade Agostinho / Elf Aquitaine Angola: Angola. 140 pp.
- Bernard, P.A. (Ed.) (1984). Coquillages du Gabon [Shells of Gabon]. Pierre A. Bernard: Libreville, Gabon. 140, 75 plates pp.
- Gofas, S.; Le Renard, J.; Bouchet, P. (2001). Mollusca, in: Costello, M.J. et al. (Ed.) (2001). European register of marine species: a check-list of the marine species in Europe and a bibliography of guides to their identification. Collection Patrimoines Naturels, 50: pp. 180–213
