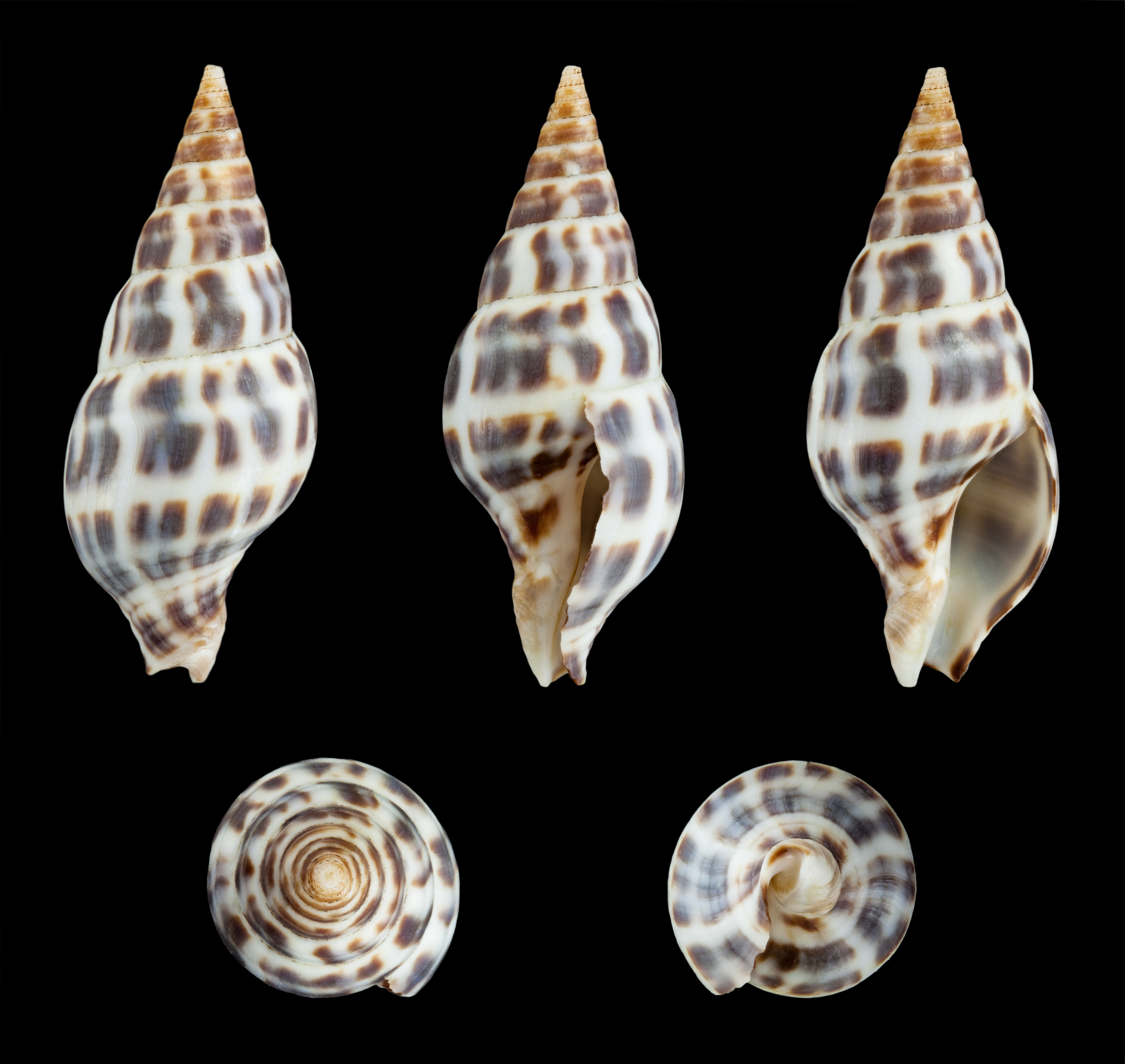
- Five views of a shell of Pusionella nifat

Scientific classification
- Kingdom: Animalia
- Phylum: Mollusca
- Class: Gastropoda
- Subclass: Caenogastropoda
- Order: Neogastropoda
- Superfamily: Conoidea
- Family: Clavatulidae
- Genus: Pusionella
- Species: P. nifat

Binomial name
- Pusionella nifat (Bruguiere, 1789)

Synonyms
- Buccinum nifat Bruguiere, 1789; Fusus albocinctus Petit de la Saussaye, 1851; Fusus scalarinus Lamarck, 1816; Pusionella albocincta (Petit de la Saussaye, 1851)

= Pusionella nifat =

Species of gastropod

Pusionella nifat is a species of sea snail, a marine gastropod mollusk in the family Clavatulidae.

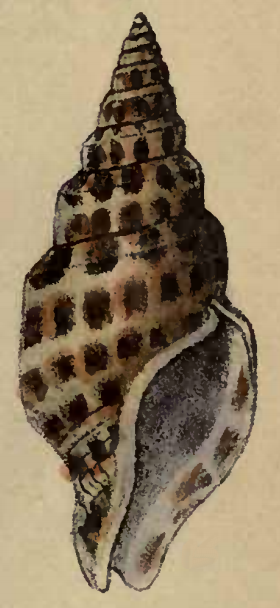
Pusionella nifat var. scalarina, the shouldered form

== Description ==
The whorls are usually narrowly shouldered above. The shell is whitish under a light olivaceous, thin epidermis, with several revolving series of square chestnut spots. The base is constricted, with a few engraved striae. The shouldered form is Pusionella nifat scalarina

This species differs from Pusionella vulpina by its median white band.

== Distribution ==
This species occurs in the Atlantic Ocean off West Africa (Gabon, Cameroon) and Angola. Living species have been dredged up in the Mediterranean Sea off Algeria.
