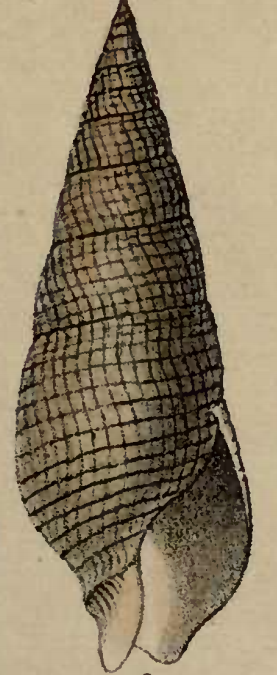
- Clavatula milleti (Petit de la Saussaye, S., 1851)

Scientific classification
- Kingdom: Animalia
- Phylum: Mollusca
- Class: Gastropoda
- Subclass: Caenogastropoda
- Order: Neogastropoda
- Superfamily: Conoidea
- Family: Clavatulidae
- Genus: Pusionella
- Species: P. lupinus

Binomial name
- Pusionella lupinus (Philippi, 1850)

Synonyms
- Fusus lupinus Philippi, 1850

= Pusionella lupinus =

Species of gastropod

Pusionella lupinus is a species of sea snail, a marine gastropod mollusk in the family Clavatulidae.

This species is also considered a synonym of Pusionella milleti milleti (Petit de la Saussaye, S., 1851). This has also become a synonym of Clavatula milleti

== Description ==
The size of an adult shell varies between 15 mm and 55 mm. The shell is whitish, or has a yellowish flesh-color, or brown. It is more or less decussated by longitudinal and revolving engraved lines, sometimes forming granulations especially on the spire. The revolving lines are prominent on the body whorl, where the longitudinal ones are usually subobsolete.

== Distribution ==
This species occurs in the Atlantic Ocean off West Africa, and particularly off Senegal.
