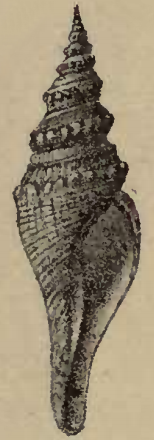
- Drawing of a shell of Fusiturris pluteata

Scientific classification
- Kingdom: Animalia
- Phylum: Mollusca
- Class: Gastropoda
- Subclass: Caenogastropoda
- Order: Neogastropoda
- Superfamily: Conoidea
- Family: Fusiturridae
- Genus: Fusiturris
- Species: F. pluteata

Binomial name
- Fusiturris pluteata (Reeve, 1843)

Synonyms
- Pleurotoma mandarina Marrat, F.P., 1877; Pleurotoma pluteata Reeve, 1843; Surcula pluteata Reeve, 1843; Turris pluteata Reeve

= Fusiturris pluteata =

Species of gastropod

Fusiturris pluteata is a species of sea snail, a marine gastropod mollusk in the family Fusiturridae.

== Description ==
The size of an adult shell varies between 25 mm and 32 mm. The shell is narrowly fusiform, with an elevated, acuminated spire and a long, narrow, twisted siphonal canal. The anal sinus is rather shallow and wide. The whorls show a shelf below the sutures, and a central revolving carina of small nodules. The color of the shell is horn-color, the nodules are white.

== Distribution ==
This species occurs in the Atlantic Ocean off Madeira and West Africa (Senegal, Gabon)

== Bibliography ==
- Bernard, P.A. (Ed.) (1984). Coquillages du Gabon [Shells of Gabon]. Pierre A. Bernard: Libreville, Gabon. 140, 75 plates pp.
