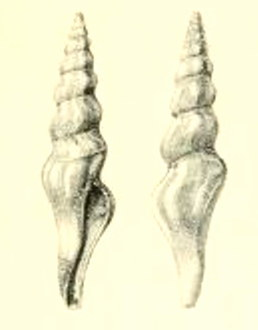
- Original drawing with two views of a shell of Fusiturris torta

Scientific classification
- Kingdom: Animalia
- Phylum: Mollusca
- Class: Gastropoda
- Subclass: Caenogastropoda
- Order: Neogastropoda
- Superfamily: Conoidea
- Family: Fusiturridae
- Genus: Fusiturris
- Species: F. torta

Binomial name
- Fusiturris torta (Dautzenberg, 1912)

Synonyms
- Pleurotoma torta Dautzenberg, 1912; Turris torta Dautzenberg

= Fusiturris torta =

Species of gastropod

Fusiturris torta is a species of sea snail, a marine gastropod mollusk in the family Fusiturridae.

== Description ==
The size of an adult shell varies between 15 and 30 mm (0.59 and 1.18 in).

(Translation of the original French description) The slightly shiny shell is solid and has an elongated fusiform shape. The turreted spire is composed of 9 very convex whorls, subcarinated on their extremes. They are separated by a very marked oblique suture, covered with sigmoid growth lines, fine decurrent striae and large, wide and nodular oblique longitudinal folds, numbering 6 on each of the last two whorls. The body whorl measures half of the total height of the shell. It finishes in a long, narrow and slightly twisted siphonal canal. The elongated aperture is angular at the top. The columella is sinuated at the top, then a little oblique. The simple outer lip is sharp. The color of the aperture is a dirty, uniform white, but is slightly tinged with red on the end of the siphonal canal. The ground color of the shell is a white uniform ivory.

== Distribution ==
This species occurs in the Atlantic Ocean between Gabon and Angola.

== Bibliography ==
- Bernard, P.A. (Ed.) (1984). Coquillages du Gabon [Shells of Gabon]. Pierre A. Bernard: Libreville, Gabon. 140, 75 plates pp.
