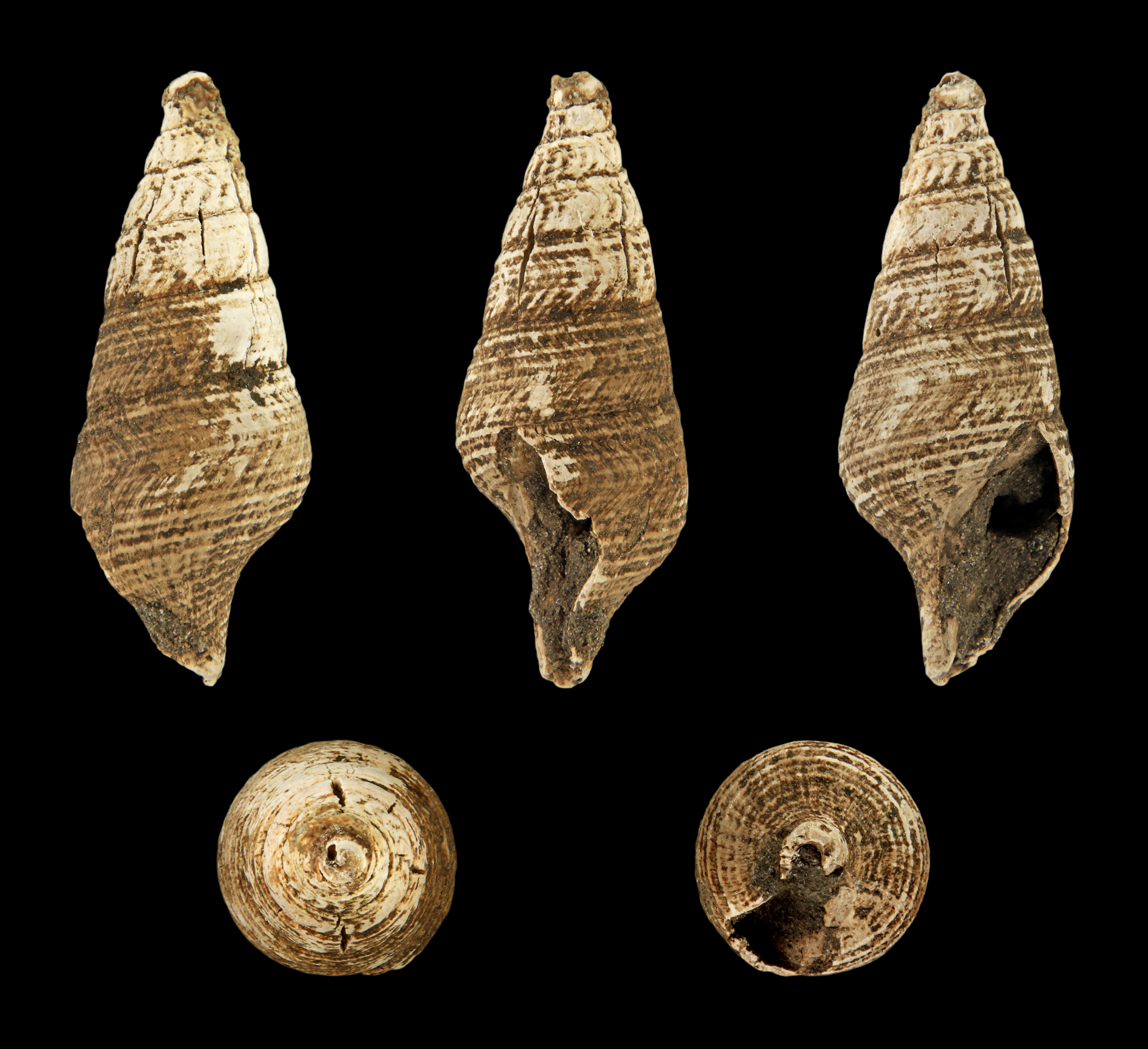
- Fossil shells of Fusiturris duchasteli flexiplicata

Scientific classification
- Kingdom: Animalia
- Phylum: Mollusca
- Class: Gastropoda
- Subclass: Caenogastropoda
- Order: Neogastropoda
- Superfamily: Conoidea
- Family: Fusiturridae
- Genus: Fusiturris; Thiele, 1929

Type species
- Pleurotoma undatiruga Bivona Ant. in Bivona And., 1838

Synonyms
- Pleurotoma (Tyrrhenoturris) Coen, 1929 (original rank); Turris (Fusiturris) Thiele, 1929 (original rank); Tyrrhenoturris Coen, 1929

= Fusiturris =

Genus of gastropods

Fusiturris is a genus of sea snails, marine gastropod mollusks in the family Fusiturridae.

== Taxonomy ==
Before 2018, this genus was part of Clavatulidae.

== Species ==
Species within the genus Fusiturris include:

- Fusiturris amianta (Dautzenberg, 1912)
- † Fusiturris aquensis (Grateloup, 1832)
- † Fusiturris duchasteli flexiplicata (Kautsky, 1925)
- † Fusiturris geneifae Abbass H., 1977
- Fusiturris pfefferi (Strebel, 1912)
- Fusiturris pluteata (Reeve, 1843)
- † Fusiturris porrecta (Wood, 1848)
- Fusiturris similis (Bivona, 1838)
- Fusiturris torta (Dautzenberg, 1912)
- Fusiturris undatiruga (Bivona Ant. in Bivona And., 1838)

Species brought into synonymy

- Fusiturris kribiensis Bozzetti, 2015: synonym of Tomellana hupferi var. fusca (Strebel, 1912) accepted as Tomellana hupferi (Strebel, 1912)
