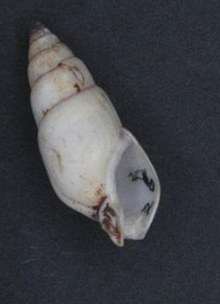
- Apertural view of a shell of Pusionella buccinata (museum specimen at Naturalis Biodiversity Center)

Scientific classification
- Kingdom: Animalia
- Phylum: Mollusca
- Class: Gastropoda
- Subclass: Caenogastropoda
- Order: Neogastropoda
- Superfamily: Conoidea
- Family: Clavatulidae
- Genus: Pusionella
- Species: P. buccinata

Binomial name
- Pusionella buccinata (Lamarck, 1822)

Synonyms
- Fusus buccinatus Lamarck, 1822

= Pusionella buccinata =

Species of gastropod

Pusionella buccinata is a species of sea snail, a marine gastropod mollusk in the family Clavatulidae. It was first described by Lamarck in 1822.

This species has also been considered a synonym of Pusionella vulpina.

== Distribution ==
This marine species occurs off West Africa.
