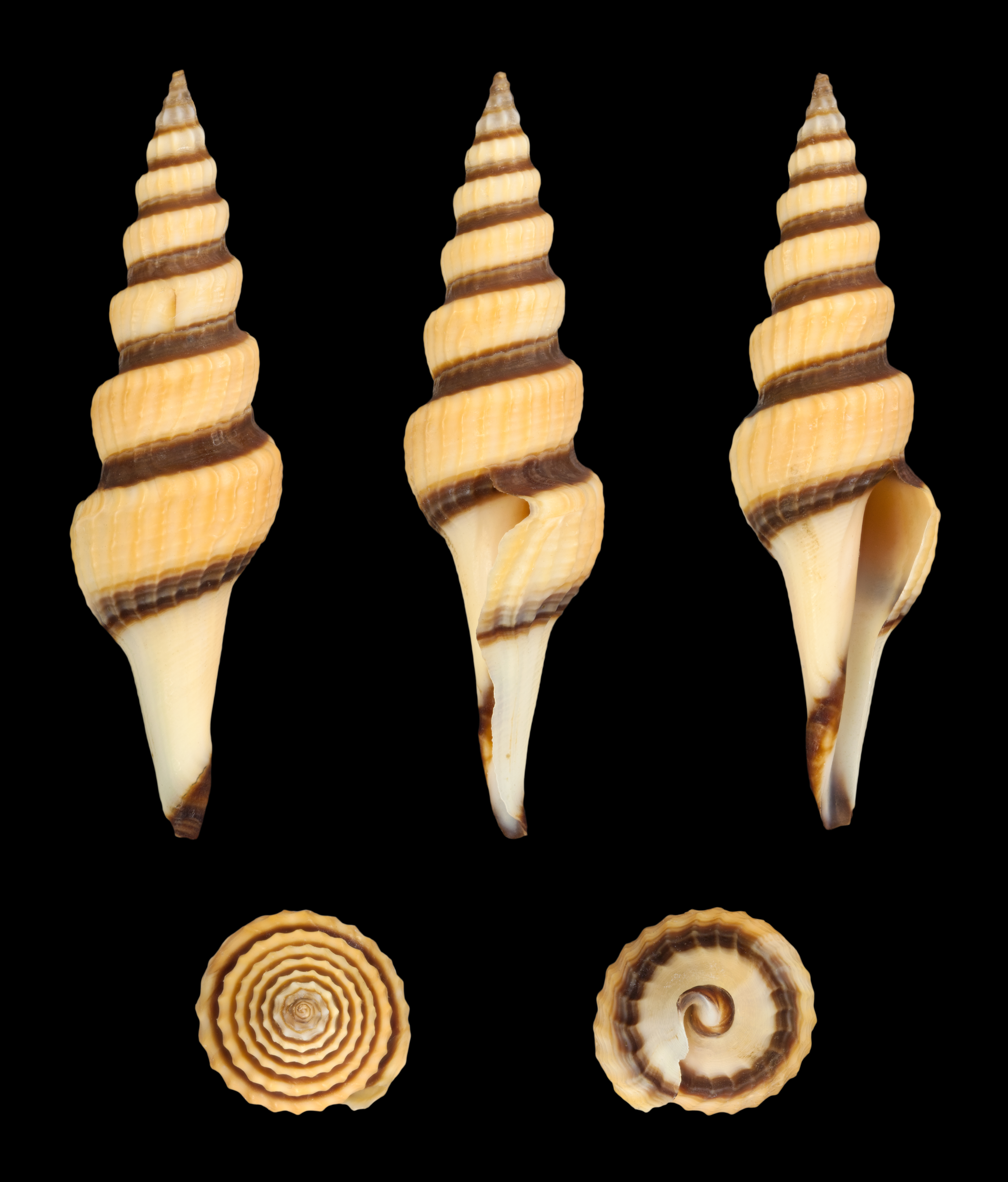
- A shell of Fusiturris similis

Scientific classification
- Kingdom: Animalia
- Phylum: Mollusca
- Class: Gastropoda
- Subclass: Caenogastropoda
- Order: Neogastropoda
- Superfamily: Conoidea
- Family: Fusiturridae
- Genus: Fusiturris
- Species: F. similis

Binomial name
- Fusiturris similis (Bivona Ant. in Bivona And., 1838)

Synonyms
- Pleurotoma balteata Kiener, 1839; Pleurotoma similis Bivona, 1838

= Fusiturris similis =

Species of gastropod

Fusiturris similis is a species of sea snail, a marine gastropod mollusk in the family Fusiturridae.

It has also been found as a fossil from the Pleistocene in Sicily.

== Description ==
The size of an adult shell varies between 30 mm and 55 mm.

== Distribution ==
This species occurs in European waters, the Mediterranean Sea, the Atlantic Ocean off the Canaries, Cape Verde, West Africa and the equatorial zone.

== Bibliography ==
- Bernard, P.A. (Ed.) (1984). Coquillages du Gabon [Shells of Gabon]. Pierre A. Bernard: Libreville, Gabon. 140, 75 plates pp.
- Gofas, S.; Le Renard, J.; Bouchet, P. (2001). Mollusca, in: Costello, M.J. et al. (Ed.) (2001). European register of marine species: a check-list of the marine species in Europe and a bibliography of guides to their identification. Collection Patrimoines Naturels, 50: pp. 180–213
- Rolán E., 2005. Malacological Fauna From The Cape Verde Archipelago. Part 1, Polyplacophora and Gastropoda.
