= Pusionella lirata =

Scientific classification
- Kingdom: Animalia
- Phylum: Mollusca
- Class: Gastropoda
- Subclass: Caenogastropoda
- Order: Neogastropoda
- Superfamily: Conoidea
- Family: Clavatulidae
- Genus: Pusionella
- Species: P. lirata

Binomial name
- Pusionella lirata Adams A., 1853

Species of gastropod

Pusionella lirata is a species of sea snail, a marine gastropod mollusk in the family Clavatulidae.

This species is also considered a synonym of Pusionella milleti milleti (Petit de la Saussaye, S., 1851). This has in turn become a synonym of Clavatula milleti.

== Description ==
The size of an adult shell varies between 15 mm and 55 mm. The shell is whitish, or has a yellowish flesh-color, or brown. It is more or less decussated by longitudinal and revolving engraved lines, sometimes forming granulations especially on the spire. The revolving lines are prominent on the body whorl, where the longitudinal ones are usually subobsolete.

== Distribution ==
This species occurs in the Atlantic Ocean off West Africa, and particularly along Senegal.
