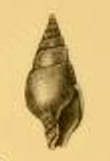
- Original image of a shell of Pusionella compacta

Scientific classification
- Kingdom: Animalia
- Phylum: Mollusca
- Class: Gastropoda
- Subclass: Caenogastropoda
- Order: Neogastropoda
- Superfamily: Conoidea
- Family: Clavatulidae
- Genus: Pusionella
- Species: P. compacta

Binomial name
- Pusionella compacta Strebel, 1914

Synonyms
- Fusus buccinatus Lamarck, 1822

= Pusionella compacta =

Species of gastropod

Pusionella compacta is a species of sea snail, a marine gastropod mollusk in the family Clavatulidae.

== Description ==
The shell grows to a length of 26 mm.

(Original description) This form differs from the group of Clavatula milleti (synonym: Pusionella milleti) in her characteristic feature of the sculpture: the continuous vertical spiral suture is missing. They occur only up to the 7th whorl yet and then disappear completely, and as otherwise deviations also occur, so this form must be singled out. The compact spire contains 11–12 whorls. These are slightly rounded and convex. The aperture is the same as in Clavatula milleti. The callus at the anal sinus stands out clearly.

== Distribution ==
This species occurs in the Atlantic Ocean off West Africa and Angola.
