= Paracercomonadidae =

Scientific classification
- Domain: Eukaryota
- Supergroup: Rhizaria
- Phylum: Cercozoa
- Subphylum: Filosa
- Infraphylum: Monadofilosa
- Order: Paracercomonadida; Cavalier-Smith in Cavalier-Smith, Chao & Lewis 2018
- Family: Paracercomonadidae; Cavalier-Smith in Cavalier-Smith & Karpov 2012

Type genus
- Paracercomonas Cavalier-Smith & Bass in Karpov et al. 2006

Genera
- Paracercomonas; Nucleocercomonas; Metabolomonas; Brevimastigomonas; Phytocercomonas

Synonyms
- Paracercomonadida: Paracercomonadina Cavalier-Smith in Cavalier-Smith & Karpov 2012

Family of protists

The paracercomonads are a group of cercozoan protists. Taxonomically, they comprise the family Paracercomonadidae, order Paracercomonadida and subclass Paracercomonadia. Due to their morphological similarities to the cercomonads, members of this family were grouped with Cercomonas and similar taxa from the beginning. However, their similarities are due to convergent evolution.

== Classification ==
There are currently 5 genera of paracercomonads:

- Brevimastigomonas Brabender et al. 2012
- Metabolomonas Brabender et al. 2012
- Nucleocercomonas Brabender et al. 2012
- Paracercomonas Cavalier-Smith & Bass in Karpov et al. 2006
- Phytocercomonas Braithwaite 2013
