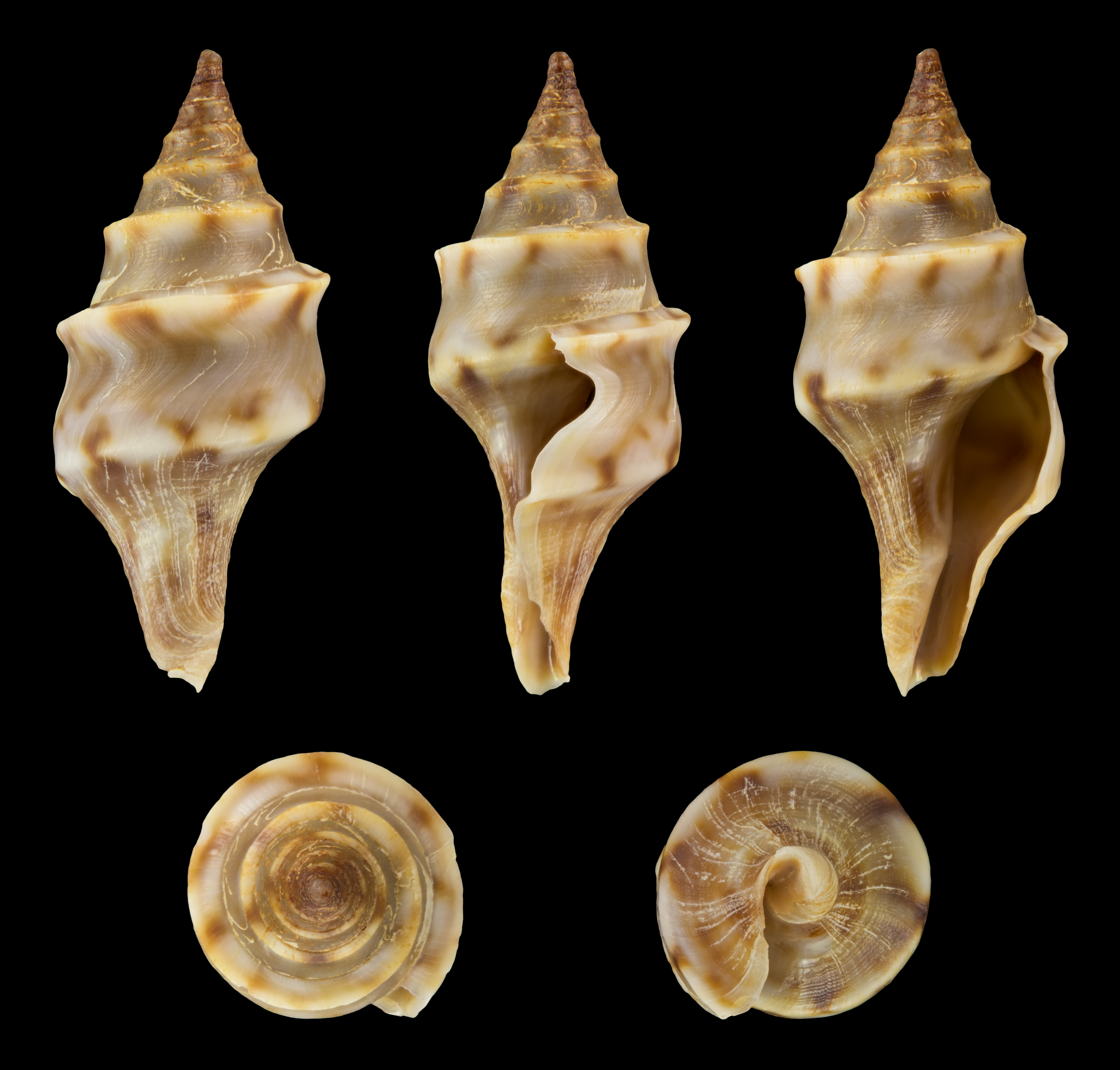
- Apertural view of a shell of Perrona spirata

Scientific classification
- Kingdom: Animalia
- Phylum: Mollusca
- Class: Gastropoda
- Subclass: Caenogastropoda
- Order: Neogastropoda
- Superfamily: Conoidea
- Family: Clavatulidae
- Genus: Perrona
- Species: P. spirata

Binomial name
- Perrona spirata (Lamarck, 1816)

Synonyms
- Clavatula spirata (Lamarck, 1816); Pleurotoma spirata Lamarck, 1816

= Perrona spirata =

Species of gastropod

Perrona spirata is a species of sea snail, a marine gastropod mollusk in the family Clavatulidae.

== Description ==
The size of an adult shell varies between 20 and 30 millimetres (0.79 and 1.18 in). The whorls are constricted around the upper part, with a rather sharp ridge next to the suture, and an obtuse angle below the constriction. The color of the shell is yellowish, mottled and striped with chestnut.
