= Jessicka =

Jessicka may refer to:

- Jessicka, a variant of the female given name Jessica (given name)
- Jessicka (singer) (born 1975), American musician
- Jessicka Havok (born 1986), American professional wrestler

== See also ==
- Jessika (disambiguation)
- Jessica (disambiguation)
