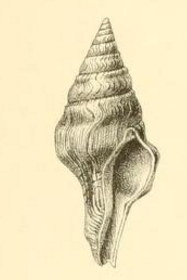
- Original drawing of a shell of Perrona subspirata

Scientific classification
- Kingdom: Animalia
- Phylum: Mollusca
- Class: Gastropoda
- Subclass: Caenogastropoda
- Order: Neogastropoda
- Superfamily: Conoidea
- Family: Clavatulidae
- Genus: Perrona
- Species: P. subspirata

Binomial name
- Perrona subspirata (Martens, 1902)

Synonyms
- Clavatula subspirata (Martens, 1902); Pleurotoma subspirata Martens, 1902

= Perrona subspirata =

Species of gastropod

Perrona subspirata is a species of sea snail, a marine gastropod mollusk in the family Clavatulidae.

== Description ==
The length of the shell attains 25.5 mm, its diameter 11 mm.

== Distribution ==
This species occurs in the Atlantic Ocean off Angola.
