= Dennis Miller Bunker =

American painter

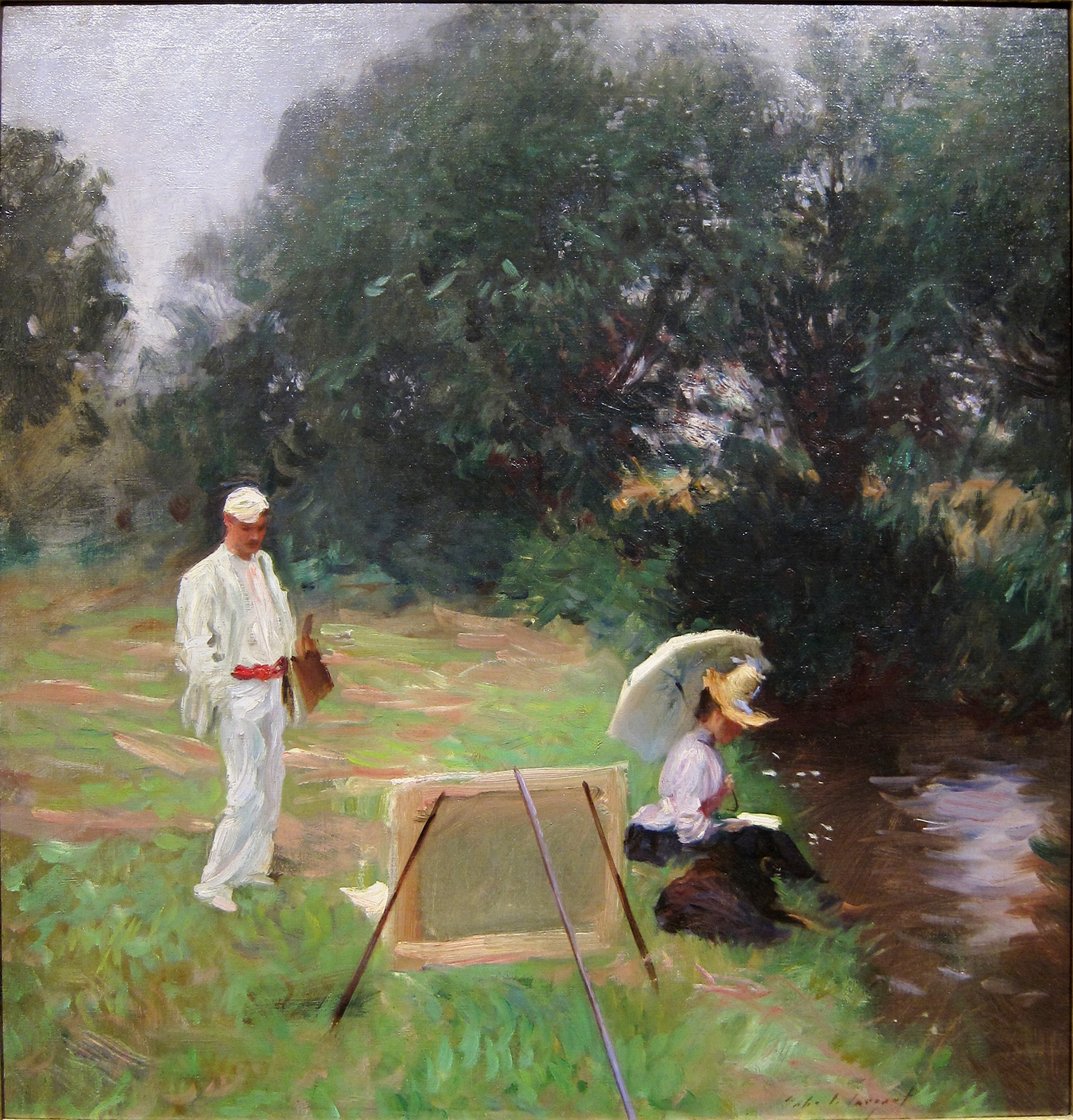
- Dennis Miller Bunker Painting at Calcot, John Singer Sargent, 1888
- Born: November 6, 1861; New York City
- Died: December 28, 1890 (aged 29); Boston
- Education: Art Students League of New York, National Academy of Design, École des Beaux-Arts
- Known for: Painting
- Movement: American Impressionism
- Awards: Third Hallgarten Prize (1885)

Dennis Miller Bunker (November 6, 1861 – December 28, 1890) was an American painter and innovator of American Impressionism. His mature works include both brightly colored landscape paintings and dark, finely drawn portraits and figures. One of the major American painters of the late 19th century, and a friend of many prominent artists of the era, Bunker died from meningitis at the age of 29.

== Life ==
Bunker was born in New York City to Matthew Bunker, the secretary-treasurer of the Union Ferry Company, and his wife, Mary Anne Eytinge Bunker (sister of illustrator Sol Eytinge Jr.). In 1876 he enrolled at the Art Students League of New York and the National Academy of Design. By 1880 he was participating in the annual exhibitions of the National Academy, the American Watercolor Society, and the Brooklyn Art Association.

In 1881 Bunker exhibited a watercolor at the Boston Art Club. He subsequently exhibited both oil paintings and watercolors at the Club in 1882 and 1883. In 1886, the American printmaker Louis Prang exhibited two of Bunker's works from his own collection at the Club.

In 1882 Bunker left New York to study at the École nationale supérieure des Beaux-Arts in Paris, most notably with Jean-Léon Gérôme. In the spring of 1883, accompanied by fellow students Charles A. Platt and Kenneth R. Cranford, Bunker left Paris to travel through the French countryside and the coast of Normandy, returning to continue his studies in mid-October. The following year the three artists summered and painted in Brittany. By year's end Bunker had returned to New York City.

In 1885 Bunker was elected to the Society of American Artists. In October of that year, at the recommendation of James Carroll Beckwith, he moved to Boston to teach at the Cowles Art School, where he was the chief instructor of figure and cast drawing, artistic anatomy, and composition. He lived and taught in the art school building. Concurrently Bunker was given his first solo exhibition, at Noyes and Blakeslee Gallery in Boston. Despite these successes, Bunker was homesick for France, and wrote of feeling "supremely ridiculous" in "this atmosphere of wealth and respectability". While meager finances prevented him from staying in Boston during the summer, let alone traveling to Europe, Bunker did accept an invitation from Abbott Handerson Thayer to join him and paint in South Woodstock, Connecticut in 1886. In that year he also met Isabella Stewart Gardner, who would prove to be a valuable friend and patron.

Bunker painted portraits during the winter of 1887, and spent the summer in Newburyport, Massachusetts with artist friends; including Henry Oliver Walker. In November he met John Singer Sargent in Boston, during the latter's first working trip to America. In 1888 Bunker undertook a number of portrait commissions of important Bostonians, including members of the Gardner family, Samuel Endicott Peabody, and J. Montgomery Sears. Bunker spent the summer in England, where he joined Sargent and his family in Calcot, painting during the day and playing tennis in the evening.

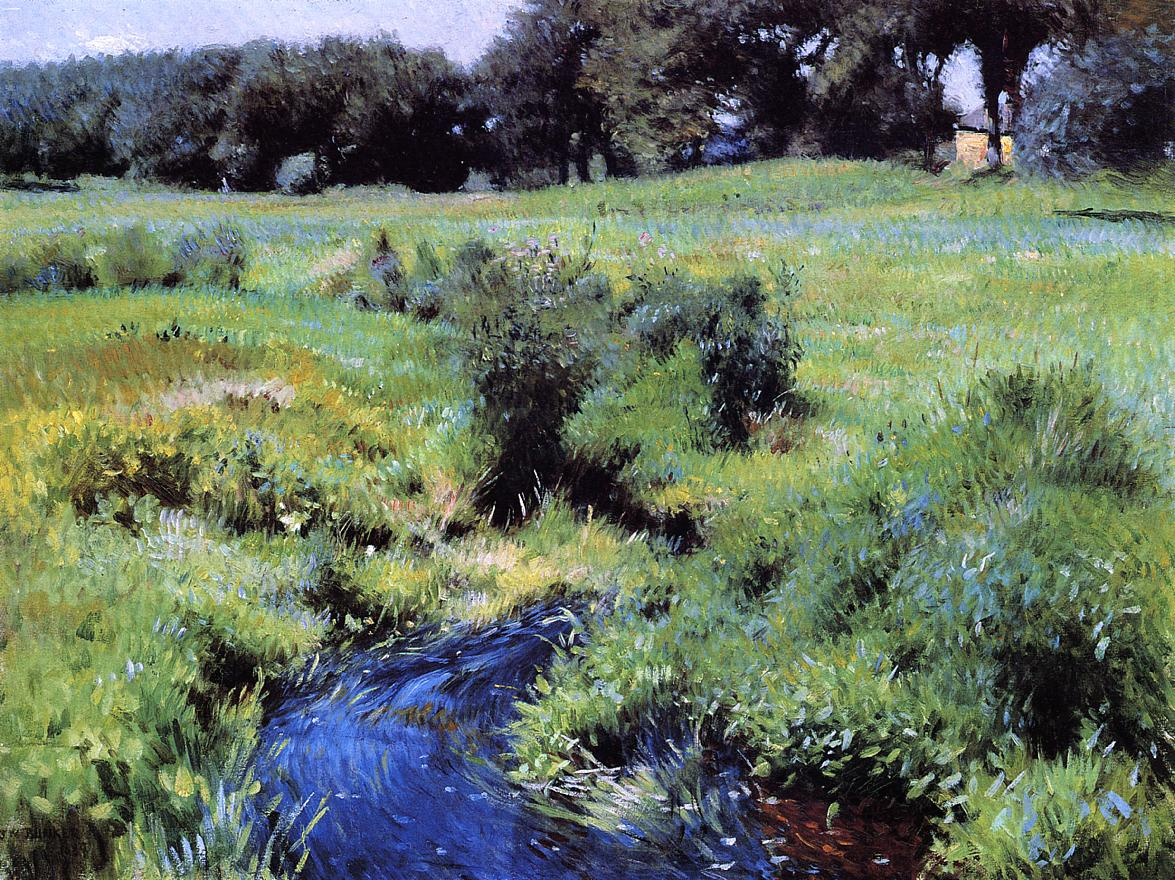
The Pool, Medfield, 1889. Museum of Fine Arts, Boston.

During the spring of 1889 Bunker resigned from the Cowles Art School. At a reception he met Eleanor Hardy, whom he would marry the following year. In the summer Bunker stayed at a boarding house in Medfield, Massachusetts, and enjoyed his most productive season of painting. In the fall he returned to New York, writing daily to Hardy in Boston. By this time, Bunker's circle of friends included not only Sargent, Gardner, and Platt, but Thomas Wilmer Dewing, William Merritt Chase, Stanford White, William Dean Howells, Charles Martin Loeffler, and Augustus Saint-Gaudens, as well.

In 1890 Bunker first exhibited his impressionist landscapes at the St. Botolph Club in Boston. He received an offer to teach at the Metropolitan Museum of Art, and planned to take over William Merritt Chase's class in Brooklyn that winter. In June he visited the art colony at Cornish, New Hampshire, and in July returned to paint further at Medfield. On October 2 Bunker married Eleanor Hardy in Boston. The couple then moved to New York. Returning to Boston to celebrate Christmas with the Hardy family, Bunker fell ill. On December 28 he died of heart failure, probably caused by cerebro-spinal meningitis. He was Buried at Milton Cemetery, Milton, MA and his tombstone was designed by his friends Stanford White and Augustus Saint-Gaudens. Platt and other friends organized a memorial exhibition at the St. Botolph Club, held in 1891.

== Work ==
The paintings of Bunker's early maturity in New York (ca. 1880-82) were often marine subjects, featuring a series of beached boats, painted on Long Island. In these he followed the standard academic practice of first painting loose, preparatory sketches (Beached, ca. 1881-2) prior to more conventionally finished exhibition pieces. The early portraits (Portrait of Walter Griffin, 1881, Portland Museum of Art) also evidence rigorous craftsmanship.

While studying in Paris, Bunker's summer excursions to the countryside resulted in another series, this time of scenes of Larmor, a town in Brittany. The focus of these compositions, be it church spire (Brittany Town Morning, Larmor, 1884, Terra Foundation for American Art), cemetery cross, or a lone tree (Tree, 1884-5, private collection), was invariably that of a richly painted, dark graphic shape against a bright sky. Nevertheless, the pictures are characterized by soft atmospheric effects and tonal subtlety. No less subtle are the landscapes Bunker painted after returning to America; paintings done in South Woodstock, Connecticut (Pines Beyond the Fence, 1886, private collection) still favor dramatic value contrasts, with subjects carefully painted against a light sky, but the palette has grown lighter, the color more saturated.

By 1887 Bunker completed his Portrait of Anne Page, a painting requiring much labor, but one of his most poignant works. In its restrained use of color, delicate modeling of form, and aesthetic elegance it is reminiscent of the works of Thayer and James McNeill Whistler. There soon followed the Boston commissions, portraits mostly of male sitters—still somber in tone, they are painted in a more confident manner, suggesting the influence of Sargent (Portrait of George Augustus Gardner, 1888, Museum of Fine Arts, Boston).

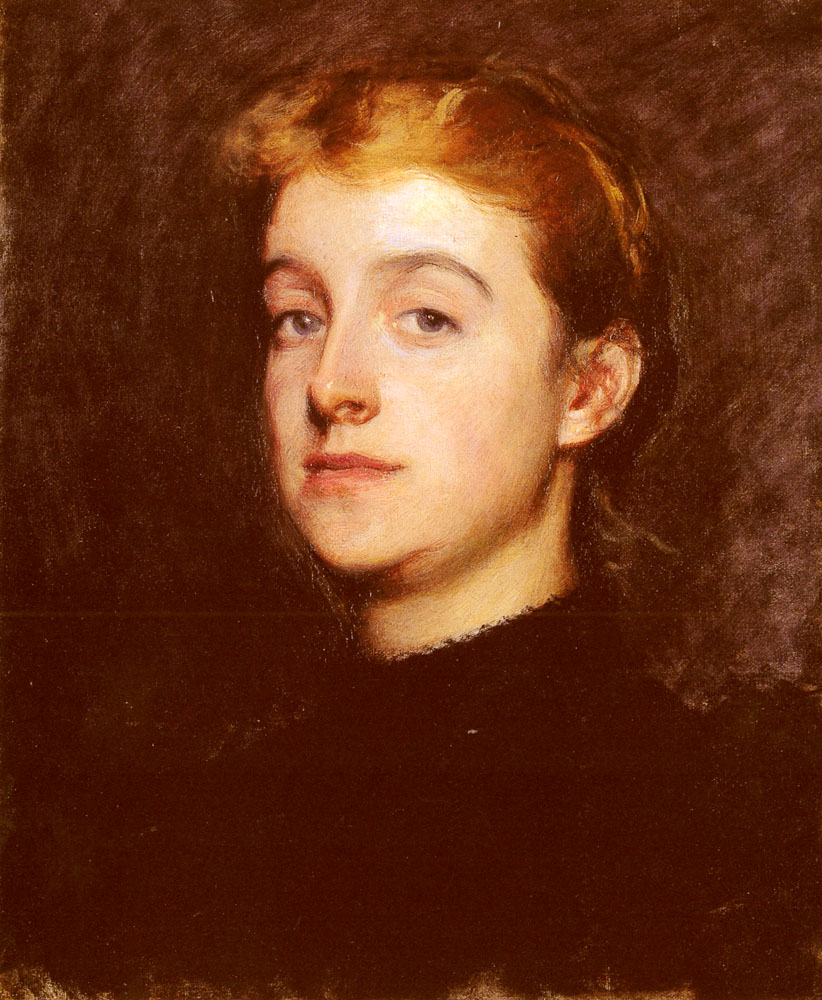
Portrait Sketch of Eleanor Hardy Bunker, 1890. Private collection.

That Bunker spent the summer of 1888 painting with Sargent is verified by personal correspondence, as well as through several pieces by the latter artist (Dennis Miller Bunker Painting at Calcot, 1888, Terra Foundation for American Art), but no paintings of the English sojourn by Bunker have survived; possibly he destroyed them in dissatisfaction. However, once back in Boston the experience came to fruition, for over the next two years Bunker produced a series of canvases which evidenced that he was one of the first American artists to fully understand and successfully practice impressionism. In the Greenhouse, ca. 1888, Chrysanthemums, 1888 (Isabella Stewart Gardner Museum), The Pool, Medfield, 1889 (Museum of Fine Arts, Boston), and Meadow Lands, 1890 (Museum of Fine Arts, Boston) all feature a rich palette, vertiginous compositions, and his unique "fish hook" shaped brush strokes.

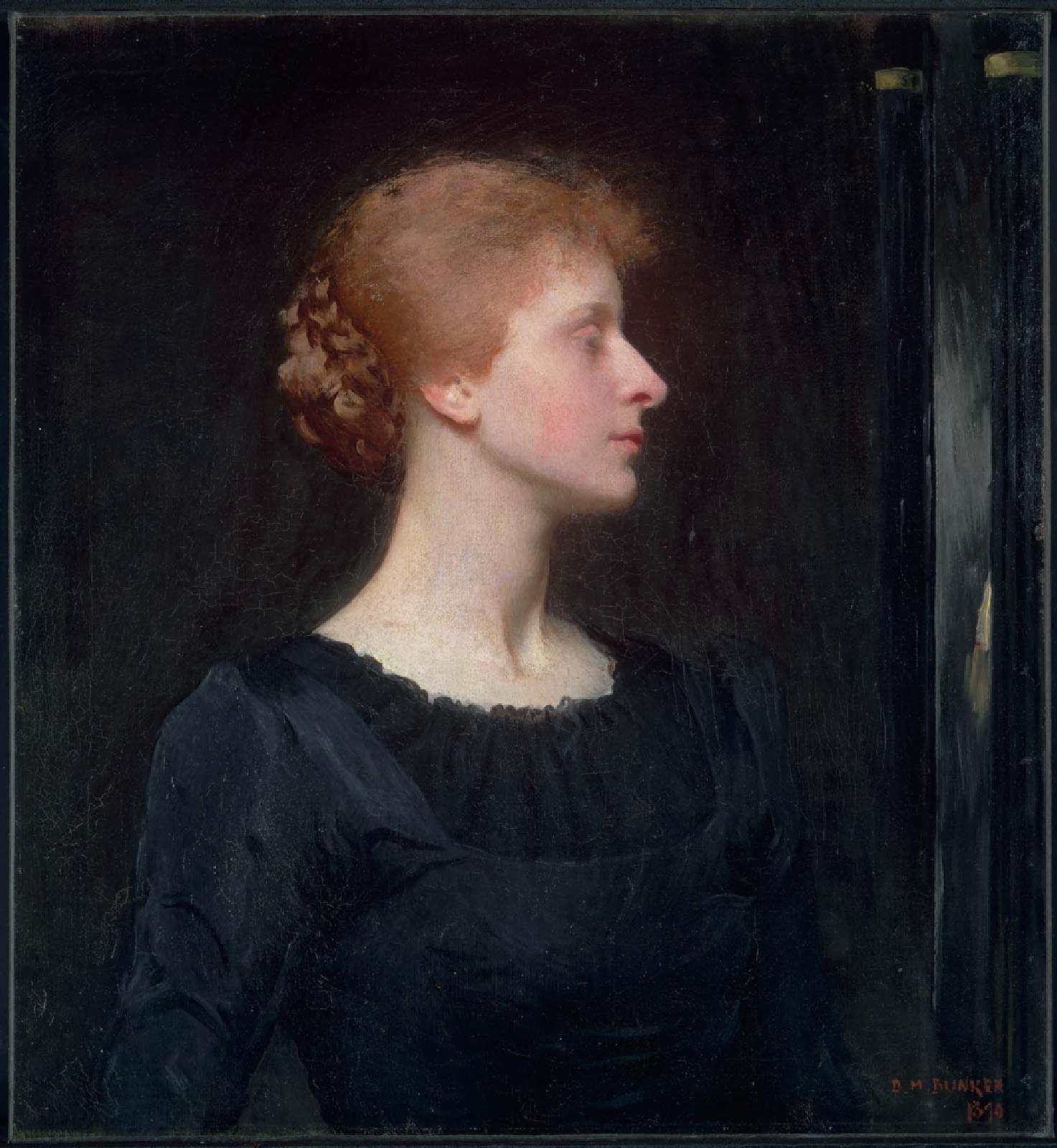
Jessica, 1890. Museum of Fine Arts, Boston

At the same time, Bunker's last figure pieces remained faithful to his academic training. Jessica, 1890 (Museum of Fine Arts, Boston), The Mirror, 1890 (Terra Foundation for American Art), and Eleanor Hardy Bunker, 1890 (Metropolitan Museum of Art) are characterized by a restricted color range and heightened elegance.

== Legacy ==
Although highly regarded during his lifetime, the 20th century assessment of American Impressionism was largely negative, and Bunker's work was all but forgotten soon after his death. His teachings influenced a number of painters (upon his resignation from the Cowles school, his students wrote a letter of appreciation, urging him to reconsider), among whom were William McGregor Paxton and Lilla Cabot Perry. It was a student of Paxton's named R. H. Ives Gammell who did the most to maintain Bunker's reputation, organizing two exhibitions at the Museum of Fine Arts, Boston in the 1940s, and publishing a biography in 1953. The current revival of interest in his work is the result of a less programmatic reassessment of 19th century art:

Thus, depending upon the viewpoint of the writer, Bunker can be seen as either a traditionalist or an innovator. In truth, he was both.
