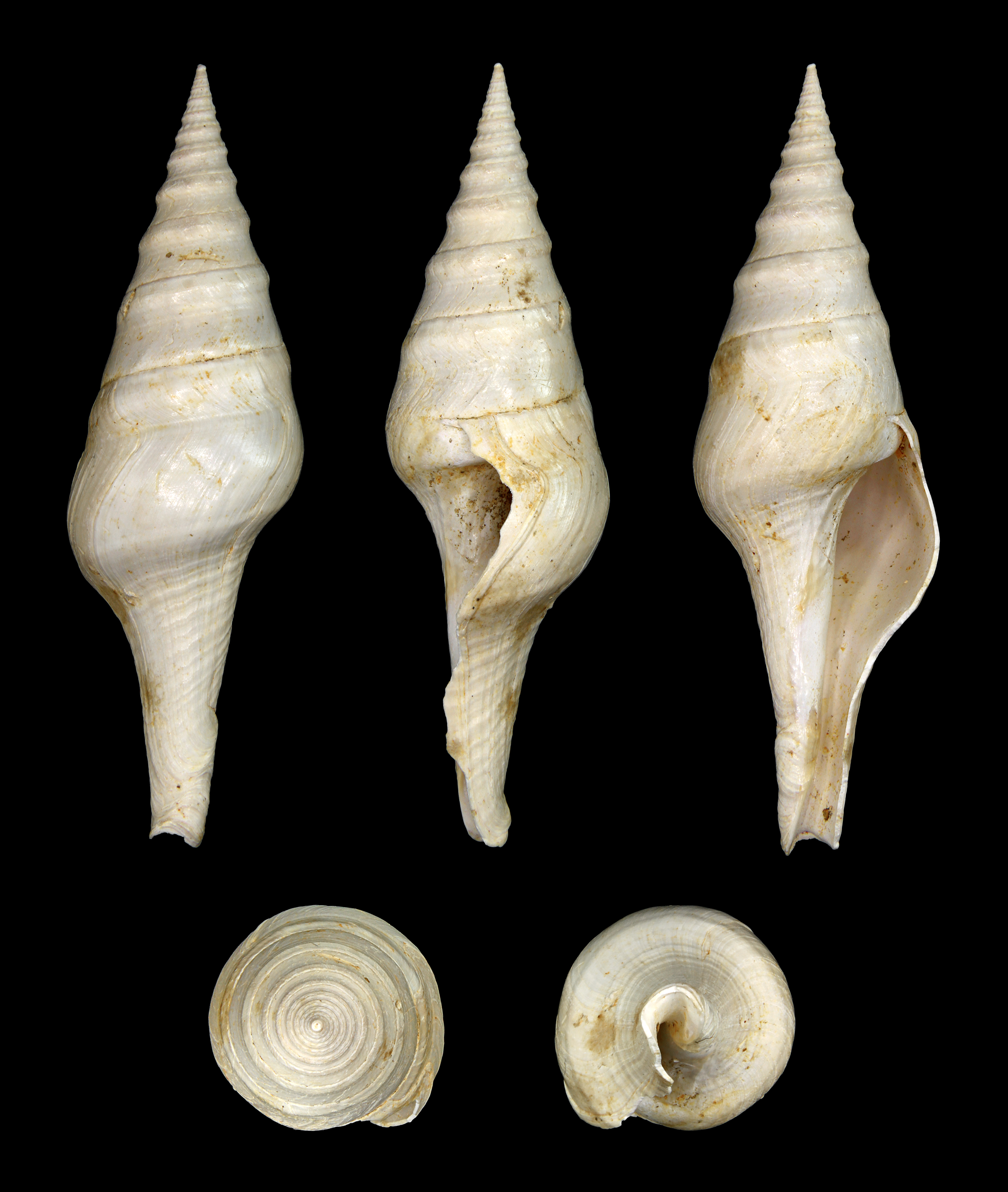
- Shell of Tomellana semimarginata

Scientific classification
- Kingdom: Animalia
- Phylum: Mollusca
- Class: Gastropoda
- Subclass: Caenogastropoda
- Order: Neogastropoda
- Superfamily: Conoidea
- Family: Clavatulidae
- Genus: Tomellana (Wenz, 1943)

Type species
- Clavatula lineata (Lamarck, 1816)

Synonyms
- Tomella Swainson, 1840

= Tomellana =

Genus of gastropods

Tomellana is a genus of sea snail marine gastropod mollusks in the family Clavatulidae.

Tomellana is a replacement name for Tomella Swainson, 1840, a junior homonym of Tomella Robineau-Desvoidy, 1830 (order Diptera)

== Description ==
The smooth and shining shell has a fusiform shape. The spire consists of 10 - 11 whorls and is not much longer than the body whorl. The first 1½ whorls are smooth and translucent. The width of the whorls increase slowly into becoming a bulging body whorl. The whorls are separated by a simple suture. The aperture is oval. The inner lip shows a thick callosity at the top. The siphonal canal is short and wide.

== Species ==
- † Tomellana aueri Harzhauser, Landau & R. Janssen, 2022
- † Tomellana dulaii Harzhauser, Landau & R. Janssen, 2022
- Tomellana hupferi Strebel, 1912
- † Tomellana jouannetii (Des Moulins, 1842)
- Tomellana leschkei (Strebel, 1912)
- Tomellana lineata (Lamarck, 1818)
- † Tomellana praecursor (Schaffer, 1912)
- † Tomellana semimarginata (Lamarck, 1822)

Species brought into synonymy

- Tomellana pfefferi (Strebel, 1912): synonym of Fusiturris pfefferi (Strebel, 1912)
