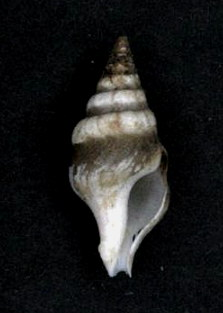
- Apertural view of a shell of Perrona obesa

Scientific classification
- Kingdom: Animalia
- Phylum: Mollusca
- Class: Gastropoda
- Subclass: Caenogastropoda
- Order: Neogastropoda
- Superfamily: Conoidea
- Family: Clavatulidae
- Genus: Perrona
- Species: P. obesa

Binomial name
- Perrona obesa (Reeve, 1842)

Synonyms
- Clavatula obesa Reeve; Pleurotoma obesa Reeve, 1842

= Perrona obesa =

Species of gastropod

Perrona obesa, common name the obese turrid, is a species of sea snail, a marine gastropod mollusk in the family Clavatulidae.

== Description ==
The size of an adult shell varies between 35 mm and 55 mm. The whorls are corded below the suture, with a constriction below the cord. The color of the shell is yellowish white, flexuously lineated with chestnut, the corded portion white.

== Distribution ==
This species occurs in the Atlantic Ocean off Angola.
