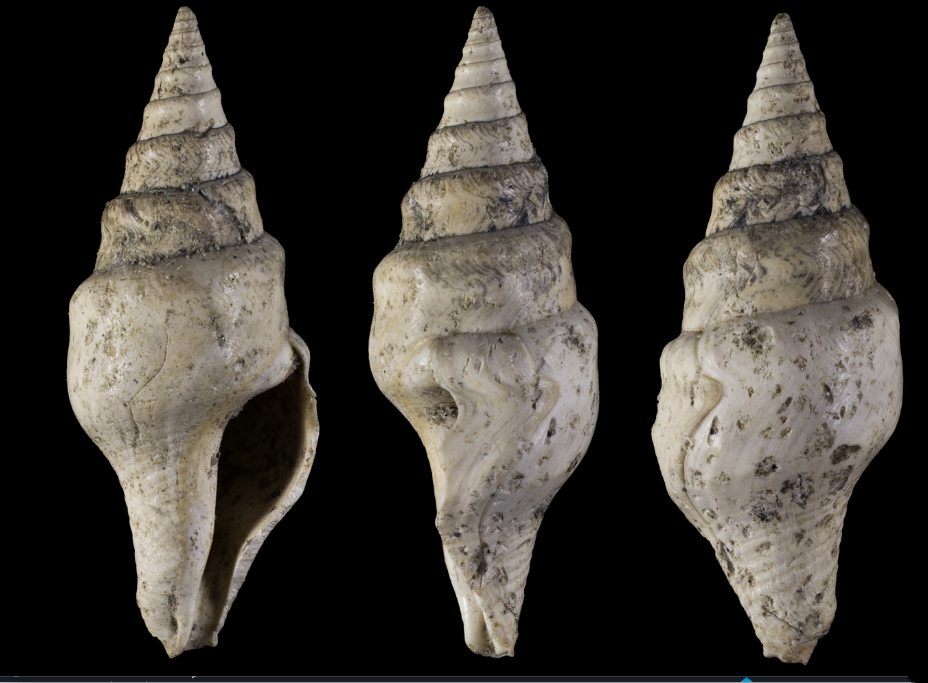
- Shell of † Perrona descendens (specimen at MNHN, Paris)

Scientific classification
- Kingdom: Animalia
- Phylum: Mollusca
- Class: Gastropoda
- Subclass: Caenogastropoda
- Order: Neogastropoda
- Superfamily: Conoidea
- Family: Clavatulidae
- Genus: Perrona
- Species: P. descendens

Binomial name
- Perrona descendens (Hilber, 1879)

Synonyms
- † Clavatula (Perrona) jouanneti descendens (Hilber, 1879); † Pleurotoma (Clavatula) descendens Hilber, 1879

= Perrona descendens =

Species of gastropod

Perrona descendens is an extinct species of sea snails, a marine gastropod mollusc in the family Clavatulidae.

== Distribution ==
Fossils of this marine species were found in Miocene strata in Romania
