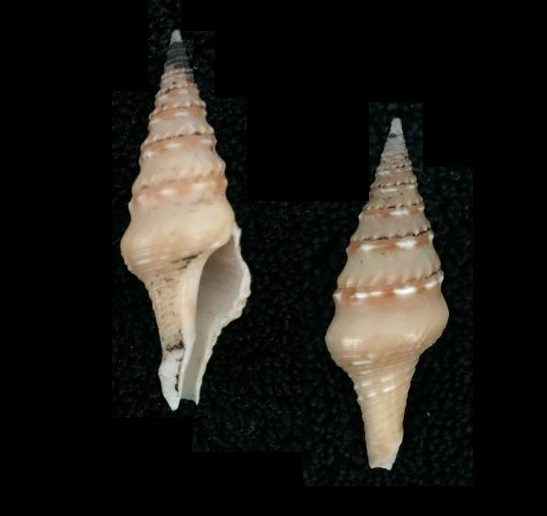
- Shell of Perrona quinteni

Scientific classification
- Kingdom: Animalia
- Phylum: Mollusca
- Class: Gastropoda
- Subclass: Caenogastropoda
- Order: Neogastropoda
- Superfamily: Conoidea
- Family: Clavatulidae
- Genus: Perrona
- Species: P. quinteni

Binomial name
- Perrona quinteni (Nolf & Verstraeten, 2006)

= Perrona quinteni =

Species of gastropod

Perrona quinteni is a species of small to medium predatory sea snail, a marine gastropod mollusk in the family Clavatulidae, first described in 2006.

== Description ==
The shell grows to a length of 46 mm.

== Distribution ==
This marine species occurs in the Atlantic Ocean off the coast of Gabon, more specifically near Mayumba and Esterias. The range of this species is from the coast of Gabon to northern Angola.
