= Jessika =

Jessika may refer to:

- Jessika, a variant of the female given name Jessica (name)
- Jessika Muscat (born 1989), having the stagename 'Jessika', Maltese singer
- Jessika (opera), 1905 opera by Josef Bohuslav Foerster
- "Jessika", 2015 song by Celeste Syn (冼佩瑾) from the soundtrack to the TV show Love or Spend

== See also ==
- Jessica (disambiguation)
- Jessicka (disambiguation)
