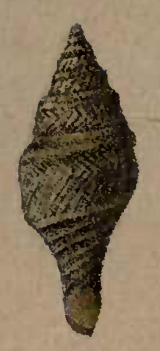
- Drawing of a shell of Perrona perron

Scientific classification
- Kingdom: Animalia
- Phylum: Mollusca
- Class: Gastropoda
- Subclass: Caenogastropoda
- Order: Neogastropoda
- Superfamily: Conoidea
- Family: Clavatulidae
- Genus: Perrona
- Species: P. perron

Binomial name
- Perrona perron (Gmelin, 1791)

Synonyms
- Murex perron Gmelin, 1791; Perrona tritonum Schumacher, 1817; Pleurotoma perronii Reeve, L.A., 1843

= Perrona perron =

Species of gastropod

Perrona perron is a species of sea snail, a marine gastropod mollusk in the family Clavatulidae.

Johann Hieronymus Chemnitz (1730–1800) adopted a Dutch name " the perron," for this species, and Lovell Augustus Reeve (1814–1865) erroneously supposing it to be in honor of a naturalist, changed its form from Clavatula perron to Clavatula perronii.

== Description ==
The shell grows to a length of 25 mm. The pale yellow, fusiform shell is turreted and rather smooth. The whorls are flat, with flexuous longitudinal lines, slightly angulated round the upper part. The lower portion of the last whorl is contracted and has several regular, distant revolving ridges. The anal sinus is nearly central.

== Distribution ==
This species occurs in the Atlantic Ocean from Gabon to North Angola.
