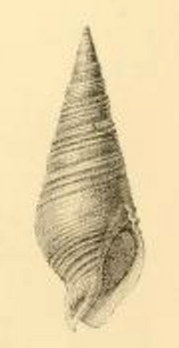
- Original drawing of a shell of Pusionella remorata

Scientific classification
- Kingdom: Animalia
- Phylum: Mollusca
- Class: Gastropoda
- Subclass: Caenogastropoda
- Order: Neogastropoda
- Superfamily: Conoidea
- Family: Clavatulidae
- Genus: Pusionella
- Species: P. remorata

Binomial name
- Pusionella remorata Sykes, 1905

= Pusionella remorata =

Species of gastropod

Pusionella remorata is a species of sea snail, a marine gastropod mollusk in the family Clavatulidae.

== Description ==
The length of the shell attains 38 mm, its diameter 13 mm.

(Original description) The elongate shell is turreted, fairly solid and shining. The color of the shell is pale yellowish-white. The acute protoconch is polished, whitish and smooth. The sculpture consists of 3-4 spirals on the earlier whorls, mainly collected below the sutures. On the body whorl, in addition, about 6 spirals encircle the base, and indications of others are seen between the two series. The second, third, and fourth whorls also show traces of longitudinal sculpture, which appears on the later whorls only as lines of growth. The shell consists of 11½ flat whorls, the last measuring just over half the length of the shell. The aperture is ovate, with a short siphonal canal. The outer lip is thin.

== Distribution ==
This species occurs in the Atlantic Ocean off West Africa.
