= Perrona micro =

Scientific classification
- Kingdom: Animalia
- Phylum: Mollusca
- Class: Gastropoda
- Subclass: Caenogastropoda
- Order: Neogastropoda
- Superfamily: Conoidea
- Family: Clavatulidae
- Genus: Perrona
- Species: P. micro

Binomial name
- Perrona micro Rolan, Ryall & Horro, 2008

Species of gastropod

Perrona micro is a species of sea snail, a marine gastropod mollusk in the family Clavatulidae.

== Distribution ==
This species occurs in the Atlantic Ocean off West Africa and Angola.
