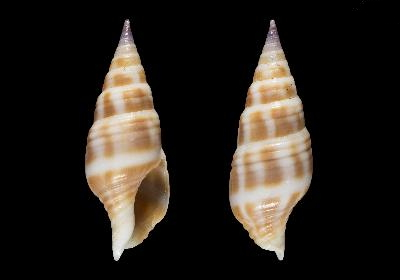
- Shell of Pusionella ghanaensis (holotype in MNHN, Paris)

Scientific classification
- Kingdom: Animalia
- Phylum: Mollusca
- Class: Gastropoda
- Subclass: Caenogastropoda
- Order: Neogastropoda
- Superfamily: Conoidea
- Family: Clavatulidae
- Genus: Pusionella
- Species: P. ghanaensis

Binomial name
- Pusionella ghanaensis Boyer & Ryall, 2006

= Pusionella ghanaensis =

Species of gastropod

Pusionella ghanaensis is a species of sea snail, a marine gastropod mollusk in the family Clavatulidae.

== Description ==
The length of the shell attains 25 mm. The protoconch is small (0.3 mm in width), smooth, and light mauve. The teleoconch consists of nearly 10 smooth and shiny whorls with an acute apex and a narrow, slightly stepped spire. Spiral furrows vary from 3 on the upper whorls to 7 on the lower, with some deeper and wider furrows below the suture. The aperture is narrow, about 42% of the shell length, with a short, sinuous siphonal canal and a well-marked siphonal notch but no anal notch. The shell's ground color is white with mauve on the spire top and rows of light honey brown axial marks separated by white spiral bands.

== Distribution ==
This species occurs in the Atlantic Ocean off Ghana.
