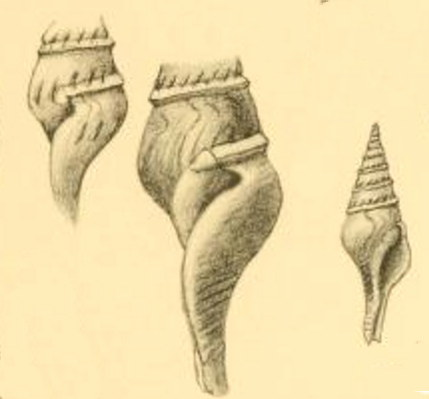
- Original drawing of a shell of Fusiturris pfefferi

Scientific classification
- Kingdom: Animalia
- Phylum: Mollusca
- Class: Gastropoda
- Subclass: Caenogastropoda
- Order: Neogastropoda
- Superfamily: Conoidea
- Family: Fusiturridae
- Genus: Fusiturris
- Species: F. pfefferi

Binomial name
- Fusiturris pfefferi (Strebel, 1912)

Synonyms
- Clavatula pfefferi (Strebel, 1912); Tomella pfefferi Strebel, 1912 (original combination); Tomellana pfefferi (Strebel, 1912)

= Fusiturris pfefferi =

Species of gastropod

Fusiturris pfefferi is a species of sea snail, a marine gastropod mollusk in the family Fusiturridae.

== Description ==
The shell grows to a length of 45 mm.

The shiny shell has a fusiform shape and resembles Tomellana hupferi (Strebel, 1912).The color of the shell is a bright brown. The protoconch consists of 1½ whorls. The 11 whorls increase downwards evenly in width.

== Distribution ==
This species occurs in the equatorial zone of the Atlantic Ocean off Gabon.
