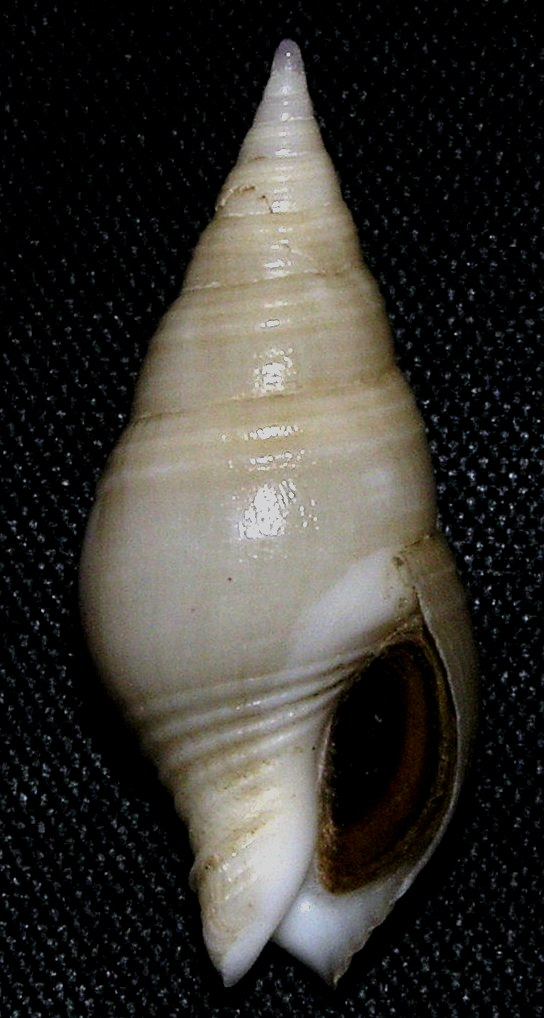
- Apertural view of a shell of Pusionella valida

Scientific classification
- Kingdom: Animalia
- Phylum: Mollusca
- Class: Gastropoda
- Subclass: Caenogastropoda
- Order: Neogastropoda
- Superfamily: Conoidea
- Family: Clavatulidae
- Genus: Pusionella
- Species: P. valida

Binomial name
- Pusionella valida (Dunker, 1852)

Synonyms
- Buccinanops valida (Dunker, 1852); Bullia valida Dunker, 1852 (basionym); Clavatula candida (Philippi, 1848); Fusus candidus Philippi, 1848; Fusus reclusianus Petit de la Saussaye, 1851; Pusionella grandis A. Adams, 1853; Pusionella haasi Dautzenberg, 1912

= Pusionella valida =

Species of gastropod

Pusionella valida is a species of sea snail, a marine gastropod mollusk in the family Clavatulidae.

== Description ==
The size of an adult shell varies between 30 mm and 40 mm. The shell is smooth and ponderous, featuring 11–12 whorls, flatly rounded, with two or three striae around the upper portion, and several at the base of the body whorl. The color of the shell is light yellowish brown.

== Distribution ==
This species occurs in the Pacific Ocean. This ascription is uncertain as this marine species probably occurs from West African to Namibia
