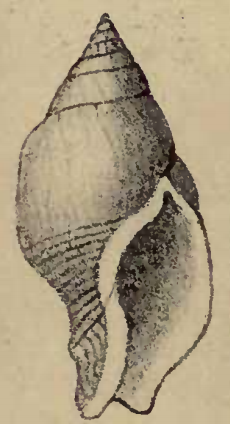
- Drawing of a shell of Pusionella rapulum

Scientific classification
- Kingdom: Animalia
- Phylum: Mollusca
- Class: Gastropoda
- Subclass: Caenogastropoda
- Order: Neogastropoda
- Superfamily: Conoidea
- Family: Clavatulidae
- Genus: Pusionella
- Species: P. rapulum

Binomial name
- Pusionella rapulum Reeve

Synonyms
- Fusus wallaysi Petit de la Saussaye, S., 1851

= Pusionella rapulum =

Species of sea snail

Pusionella rapulum is a species of sea snail, a marine gastropod mollusk in the family Clavatulidae.

== Description ==
The oblong shell is ovate The whorls are compressedly gibbous, forming a round shoulder, constricted and with revolving striae towards the base. Otherwise, the shell is smooth, except that the upper whorls of the spire are slightly longitudinally plicate. The color of the shell is whitish, under a very thin, smooth, yellowish brown epidermis. The inside of the aperture is often yellowish brown. There is a heavy, white callous deposit at the upper extremity of the inner margin of the aperture. The siphonal canal is short.

== Distribution ==
This species occurs in the Pacific Ocean off Indonesia.
