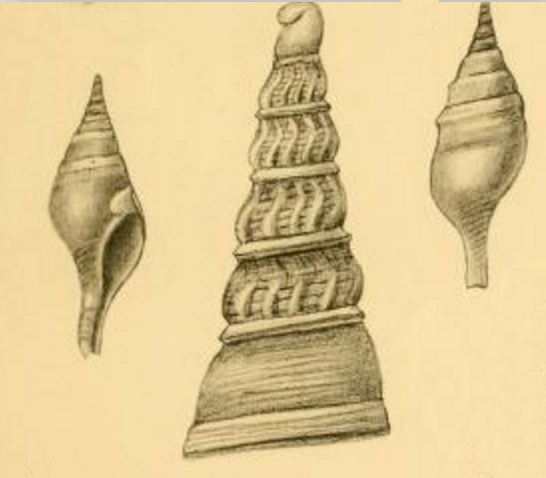
- Original drawing of a shell of Tomellana leschkei

Scientific classification
- Kingdom: Animalia
- Phylum: Mollusca
- Class: Gastropoda
- Subclass: Caenogastropoda
- Order: Neogastropoda
- Superfamily: Conoidea
- Family: Clavatulidae
- Genus: Tomellana
- Species: T. leschkei

Binomial name
- Tomellana leschkei (Strebel, 1912)

Synonyms
- Tomella lischkei Strebel, 1912

= Tomellana leschkei =

Species of gastropod

Tomellana leschkei is a species of sea snail, a marine gastropod mollusk in the family Clavatulidae.

== Description ==
The fusiform, translucent white shell is quite shiny and contains 9 - 9½ whorls. The shell is threaded with a somewhat incurved lateral contour. The aperture stands out significantly from the curvature of the body whorl. The protoconch consists of 1 - 1½ smooth whorls. The spiral sculpture is pronounced strongly on the first whorls, but then decreases gradually so that on the body whorl it becomes hard to detect. The callus at the top of the aperture is relatively well-developed.

== Distribution ==
This species occurs in the Atlantic Ocean off West Africa.
