= Paracercomonas =

Scientific classification
- Domain: Eukaryota
- Clade: Sar
- Clade: Rhizaria
- Phylum: Cercozoa
- Subphylum: Filosa
- Order: Paracercomonadida
- Family: Paracercomonadidae
- Genus: Paracercomonas; Cavalier-Smith & Bass in Karpov et al. 2006

Genus of single-celled organisms

Paracercomonas is a genus of Rhizaria.

It includes the species Paracercomonas marina.
