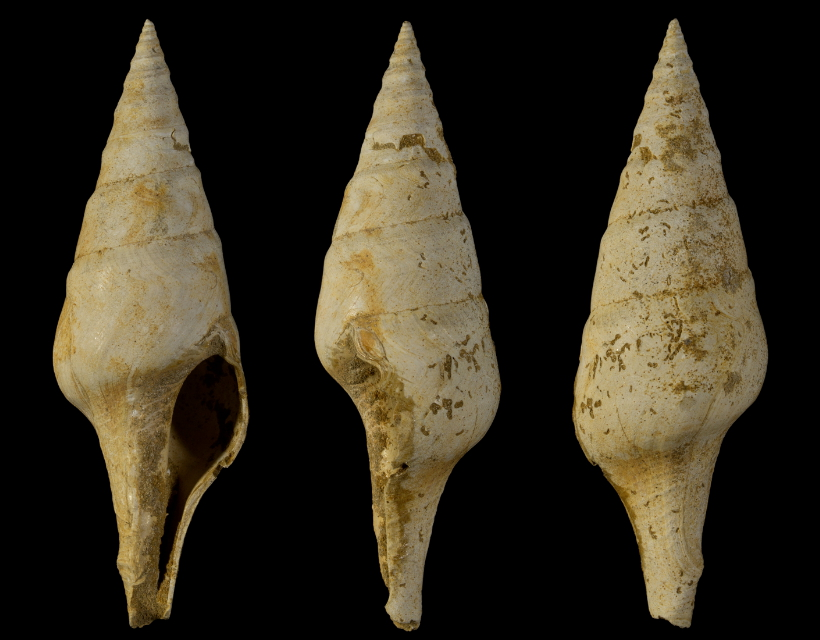
- Shell of † Tomellana semimarginata (specimen at MNHN, Paris)

Scientific classification
- Kingdom: Animalia
- Phylum: Mollusca
- Class: Gastropoda
- Subclass: Caenogastropoda
- Order: Neogastropoda
- Superfamily: Conoidea
- Family: Clavatulidae
- Genus: Tomellana
- Species: T. semimarginata

Binomial name
- Tomellana semimarginata (Lamarck, 1822)

Synonyms
- † Clavatula (Perrona) semimarginata (Lamarck, 1822); † Perrona semimarginata (Lamarck, 1822); † Pleurotoma (Perrona) semimarginata Lamarck, 1822 †; † Pleurotoma semimarginata Lamarck, 1822

= Tomellana semimarginata =

Species of gastropod

Tomellana semimarginata is an extinct species of sea snails, a marine gastropod mollusc in the family Clavatulidae.

== Distribution ==
Fossils of this marine species were found in Miocene strata in Aquitaine, France.
