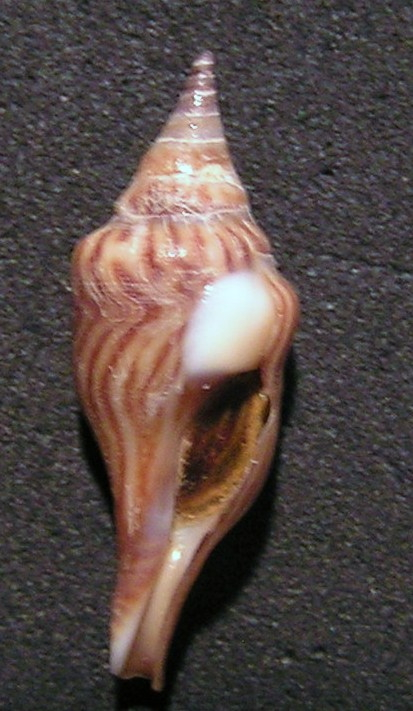
- Apertural view of a shell of Tomellana lineata

Scientific classification
- Kingdom: Animalia
- Phylum: Mollusca
- Class: Gastropoda
- Subclass: Caenogastropoda
- Order: Neogastropoda
- Superfamily: Conoidea
- Family: Clavatulidae
- Genus: Tomellana
- Species: T. lineata

Binomial name
- Tomellana lineata (Lamarck, 1816)

Synonyms
- Clavatula lineata Lamarck, 1816; Perrona lineata (Lamarck, 1816); Tomella lineata (Lamarck, 1816); Tomella lineata var. gracilis Strebel, 1912 (original combination); Tomellana lineata var. gracilis (Strebel, 1912)

= Tomellana lineata =

Species of gastropod

Tomellana lineata, common name the wavy-line turrid, is a species of sea snail, a marine gastropod mollusk in the family Clavatulidae.

== Description ==
The size of an adult shell varies between 20 mm and 45 mm. The shell is smooth with a body whorl more or less constricted above. The spire is sometimes very short, and sometimes long. The color of the shell is whitish or yellowish brown, thickly flexuously longitudinally lineated with chestnut or chocolate.

== Distribution ==
This species occurs in the Atlantic Ocean from Senegal to Angola.
