= Puya compacta =

Conservation status
- Endangered (IUCN 3.1)

Scientific classification
- Kingdom: Plantae
- Clade: Embryophytes
- Clade: Tracheophytes
- Clade: Spermatophytes
- Clade: Angiosperms
- Clade: Monocots
- Clade: Commelinids
- Order: Poales
- Family: Bromeliaceae
- Genus: Puya
- Species: P. compacta

Binomial name
- Puya compacta L.B.Sm.

Species of flowering plant

Puya compacta is a species of puya in the family Bromeliaceae. It is endemic to Ecuador.

Its natural habitat is subtropical or tropical high-elevation grassland. It is an endangered species, threatened by habitat loss.
