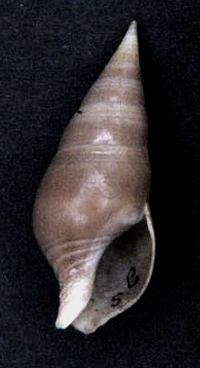
- Apertural view of a shell of Pusionella vulpina

Scientific classification
- Kingdom: Animalia
- Phylum: Mollusca
- Class: Gastropoda
- Subclass: Caenogastropoda
- Order: Neogastropoda
- Superfamily: Conoidea
- Family: Clavatulidae
- Genus: Pusionella
- Species: P. vulpina

Binomial name
- Pusionella vulpina (Born, 1780)

Synonyms
- Fusus buccinatus Lamarck, J.B.P.A. de, 1822; Murex vulpinus Born, 1780 (basionym); Pusionella rafel Pallary, P., 1920

= Pusionella vulpina =

Species of gastropod

Pusionella vulpina is a species of sea snail, a marine gastropod mollusk in the family Clavatulidae.

== Description ==
The size of an adult shell varies between 25 mm and 46 mm. The shell is stouter than the shell of Pusionella aculeiformis. There are no longitudinal ribs. The upper part of the whorls contains two or three engraved revolving lines, and several more at the base of the body whorl. Otherwise, the shell is smooth and polished, or with microscopic revolving striae. The color of the shell is moderate brown, sometimes yellowish or orange-brown.

== Distribution ==
This species occurs in the Atlantic Ocean off Morocco, Senegal, Cameroon and Gabon.
