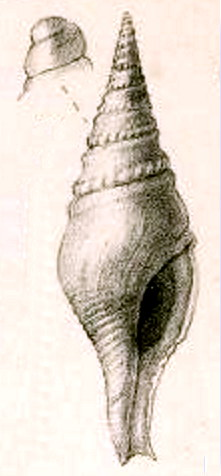
- Original drawing of a shell of Perrona jessica, also showing the protoconch

Scientific classification
- Kingdom: Animalia
- Phylum: Mollusca
- Class: Gastropoda
- Subclass: Caenogastropoda
- Order: Neogastropoda
- Superfamily: Conoidea
- Family: Clavatulidae
- Genus: Perrona
- Species: P. jessica

Binomial name
- Perrona jessica Melvill, 1923

= Perrona jessica =

Species of gastropod

Perrona jessica is a species of sea snail, a marine gastropod mollusk in the family Clavatulidae.

== Description ==
The length of the shell attains 28 mm, its diameter 9 mm.

(Original description) The shell is acuminately fusiform, shining, and very smooth. It contains 12 white and slightly bulbous whorls of which the two of the protoconch are transparent. The remainder are moderately suturally impressed, with a plicate and conspicuous revolving keel just below the suture, a plain space just below this, and then, joining on to the suture below, another carina raised and ornamented with a spiral row of small shining nodules. The body whorl is almost straight, quite smooth, shining, and milky white until the close rows of striae.

== Distribution ==
This species occurs in the Atlantic Ocean off Senegal.
