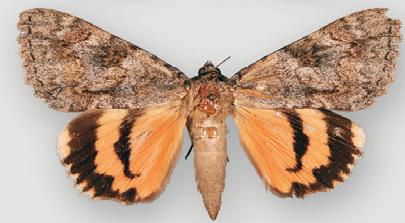

Scientific classification
- Kingdom: Animalia
- Phylum: Arthropoda
- Class: Insecta
- Order: Lepidoptera
- Superfamily: Noctuoidea
- Family: Erebidae
- Genus: Catocala
- Species: C. jessica

Binomial name
- Catocala jessica H. Edwards, 1877

Synonyms
- Catocala babayaga Strecker, 1884

= Catocala jessica =

Jessica underwing

Species of moth

Catocala jessica, the Jessica underwing, is a moth of the family Erebidae. The species was first described by Henry Edwards in 1877. It was described in the United States from Arizona through Colorado to Illinois and California.

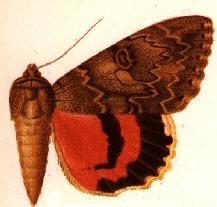
Catocala babayaga

The wingspan is about 75 mm.

The larvae feed on Populus and Salix species. Adults are on wing from June to October. There is probably one generation per year.
