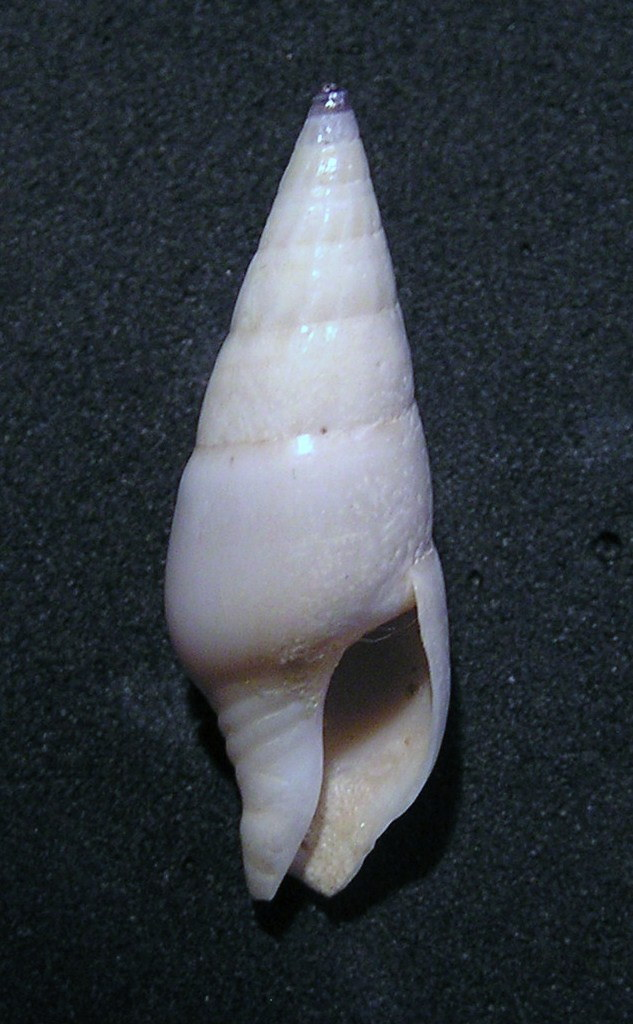
- Apertural view of a shell of Perrona aculeiformis

Scientific classification
- Kingdom: Animalia
- Phylum: Mollusca
- Class: Gastropoda
- Subclass: Caenogastropoda
- Order: Neogastropoda
- Superfamily: Conoidea
- Family: Clavatulidae
- Genus: Perrona
- Species: P. aculeiformis

Binomial name
- Perrona aculeiformis (Lamarck, 1816)

Synonyms
- Fusus aculeiformis Lamarck, 1816; Fusus catelini Petit de la Saussaye, 1851; Pusionella aculeiformis (Lamarck, 1816); Pusionella catelini (Petit de la Saussaye, 1851)

= Perrona aculeiformis =

Species of gastropod

Perrona aculeiformis is a species of sea snail, a marine gastropod mollusk in the family Clavatulidae.

== Description ==
The size of an adult shell varies between 31 mm and 54 mm. The shell is elongated and the mineralized shell is made of calcium carbonate (Chalk). The whorls of the spire are more or less plicately ribbed, sometimes only the upper ones. The body whorl is smooth except at the base, where there are revolving grooves. The color of the shell is very light grayish yellow, or yellowish brown, or chestnut.

Some specimens are shouldered varieties and were described as Pusionella catelini (Petit de la Saussaye, 1851)

== Distribution ==
This species occurs in the Atlantic Ocean off West Africa and particularly Gabon.
