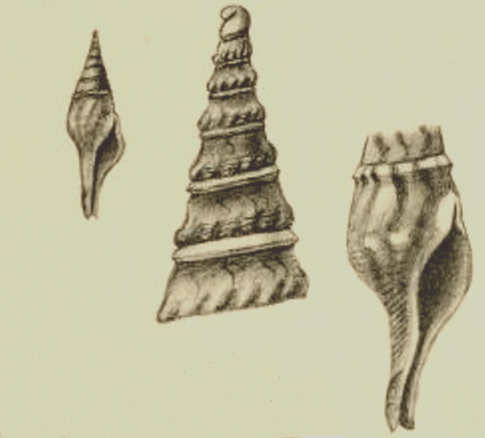
- Original drawing of shell of Tomellana hupferi

Scientific classification
- Kingdom: Animalia
- Phylum: Mollusca
- Class: Gastropoda
- Subclass: Caenogastropoda
- Order: Neogastropoda
- Superfamily: Conoidea
- Family: Clavatulidae
- Genus: Tomellana
- Species: T. hupferi

Binomial name
- Tomellana hupferi (Strebel, 1912)

Synonyms
- Fusiturris kribiensis Bozzetti, 2015; Tomella hupferi Strebel, 1912 (original combination); Tomella hupferi var. fusca Strebel, 1912 (original combination); Tomellana hupferi var. fusca (Strebel, 1912)

= Tomellana hupferi =

Species of gastropod

Tomellana hupferi is a species of sea snail, a marine gastropod mollusk in the family Clavatulidae.

== Description ==
The glossy shell corresponds in shape and construction to Tomellana lineata var. gracilis. The difference shows up visibly at the fourth whorl. The folding of the upper whorls corresponds to that of Tomellana lineata until the 6th or 7th whorl, only to become obsolete upwards. Also the spiral sculpture is lacking in the upper whorls. It becomes visible under magnification on the lower whorls as more or less clearly visible incised striae. The oval aperture below shows extensive rough furrows. The top of the aperture has a white callus that is not as prominent as in Tomellana lineata.

The color of the shell is light brownish-yellow with broad darker stripes. In the middle of the body whorl is an articulated whitish strip recognizable.

== Distribution ==
This marine species occurs off Cameroon.
