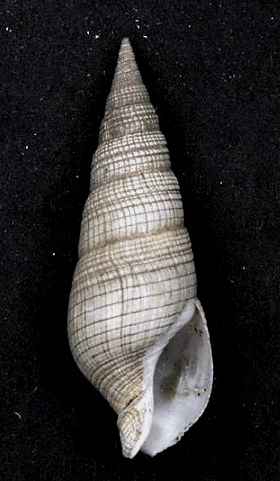
- Apertural view of a shell of Clavatula milleti (museum specimen at Naturalis Biodiversity Center)

Scientific classification
- Kingdom: Animalia
- Phylum: Mollusca
- Class: Gastropoda
- Subclass: Caenogastropoda
- Order: Neogastropoda
- Superfamily: Conoidea
- Family: Clavatulidae
- Genus: Clavatula
- Species: C. milleti

Binomial name
- Clavatula milleti (Petit de la Saussaye, 1851)

Synonyms
- Fusus milleti Petit de la Saussaye, 1851 (original combination); Fusus subgranulatus Petit de la Saussaye, 1851; Pusionella milleti milleti (Petit de la Saussaye, 1851)

= Clavatula milleti =

Species of gastropod

Clavatula milleti is a species of sea snail, a marine gastropod mollusk in the family Clavatulidae.

== Description ==
The size of an adult shell varies between 15 mm and 55 mm.

The color of the shell is whitish, or yellowish flesh-color, or brown. It is more or less decussated by longitudinal and revolving engraved lines, sometimes forming granulations especially on the spire The revolving lines are prominent on the body whorl, where the longitudinal ones are usually subobsolete.

== Distribution ==
This species occurs in the Atlantic Ocean along West Africa (Senegal)
