= Fusiturridae =

Scientific classification
- Kingdom: Animalia
- Phylum: Mollusca
- Class: Gastropoda
- Subclass: Caenogastropoda
- Order: Neogastropoda
- Superfamily: Conoidea
- Family: Fusiturridae; Abdelkrim, Aznar-Cormano, Fedosov, Kantor, Lozouet, Phuong, Zaharias & Puillandre, 2018

Family of gastropods

Fusiturridae is a family of small to medium-sized sea snails, marine gastropod mollusks in the superfamily Conoidea.

== Genera ==
- Fusiturris Thiele, 1929
