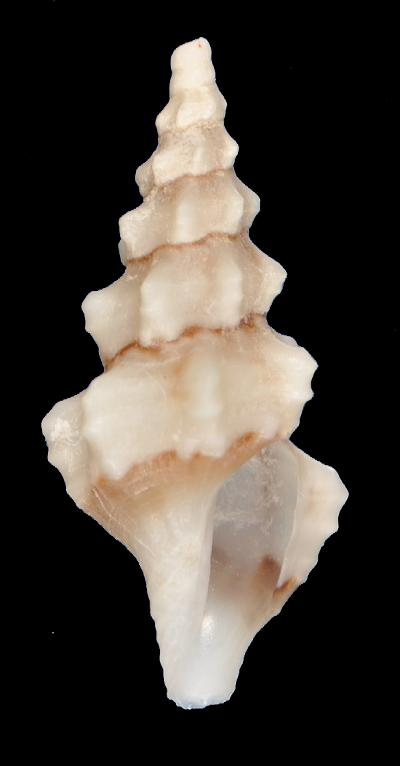
- Shell of Carinodrillia buccooensis (specimen at MNHN, Paris)

Scientific classification
- Kingdom: Animalia
- Phylum: Mollusca
- Class: Gastropoda
- Subclass: Caenogastropoda
- Order: Neogastropoda
- Superfamily: Conoidea
- Family: Pseudomelatomidae
- Genus: Carinodrillia; Dall, 1919

Type species
- Clathrodrillia halis Dall, 1919

Species
- See text

Synonyms
- Clathrodrillia (Carinodrillia) Dall, 1919 (original rank)

= Carinodrillia =

Genus of gastropods

Carinodrillia is a genus of sea snails, marine gastropod mollusks in the family Pseudomelatomidae, the turrids and allies.

== Description ==
For the species in which the spiral sculpture predominates and in which there is a tendency for the peripheral cord to form a carina, the name Carlnodrillia is proposed with Clathrodrillia halis Dall, as the type. This forms a very natural group containing a large number of species mostly unicolor, whitish or brownish.

== Species ==
Species within the genus Carinodrillia include:

- Carinodrillia adonis Pilsbry & Lowe, 1932
- Carinodrillia alboangulata (Smith E. A., 1882)
- Carinodrillia apitoa Corea, 1934
- † Carinodrillia bella (Conrad, 1862)
- Carinodrillia bilirata (Smith E.A., 1888)
- † Carinodrillia bocatoroensis Olsson, 1922
- Carinodrillia braziliensis (Smith E. A., 1915)
- Carinodrillia buccooensis Nowell-Usticke, 1971
- † Carinodrillia cymatoides Gardner, 1938
- Carinodrillia dichroa Pilsbry & Lowe, 1932
- † Carinodrillia elocata (Pilsbry & Johnson, 1922)
- † Carinodrillia felis Olsson, 1964
- † Carinodrillia fermori Dey, 1961
- † Carinodrillia fusiformis (Gabb, 1873)
- Carinodrillia halis (Dall, 1919)
- Carinodrillia hexagona (Sowerby I, 1834)
- Carinodrillia lachrymosa McLean & Poorman, 1971
- Carinodrillia mamona Corea, 1934
- Carinodrillia pilsbryi (Lowe, 1935)
- † Carinodrillia pylonia Olsson & Harbison, 1953
- Carinodrillia quadrilirata (Smith E. A., 1882)
- Carinodrillia suimaca Corea, 1934
- † Carinodrillia winchesterae Pilsbry, 1922
- † Carinodrillia zooki (Brown & Pilsbry, 1911)

Species brought into synonymy

- Carinodrillia alcestris (Dall, 1919): synonym of Compsodrillia alcestis (Dall, 1919)
- Carinodrillia bicarinata (Shasky, 1961): synonym of Compsodrillia bicarinata (Shasky, 1961)
- Carinodrillia dariena Olsson, 1971: synonym of Compsodrillia alcestis (Dall, 1919)
- Carinodrillia jaculum Pilsbry & H. N. Lowe, 1932: synonym of Compsodrillia jaculum (Pilsbry & H. N. Lowe, 1932) (original combination)
- Carinodrillia liella Corea, 1934: synonym of Buchema liella (Corea, 1934) (original combination)
- Carinodrillia limans Dall, 1919: synonym of Crassispira pellisphocae (Reeve, 1845)
- Carinodrillia tainoa Corea, 1934: synonym of Buchema tainoa (Corea, 1934) (original combination)
