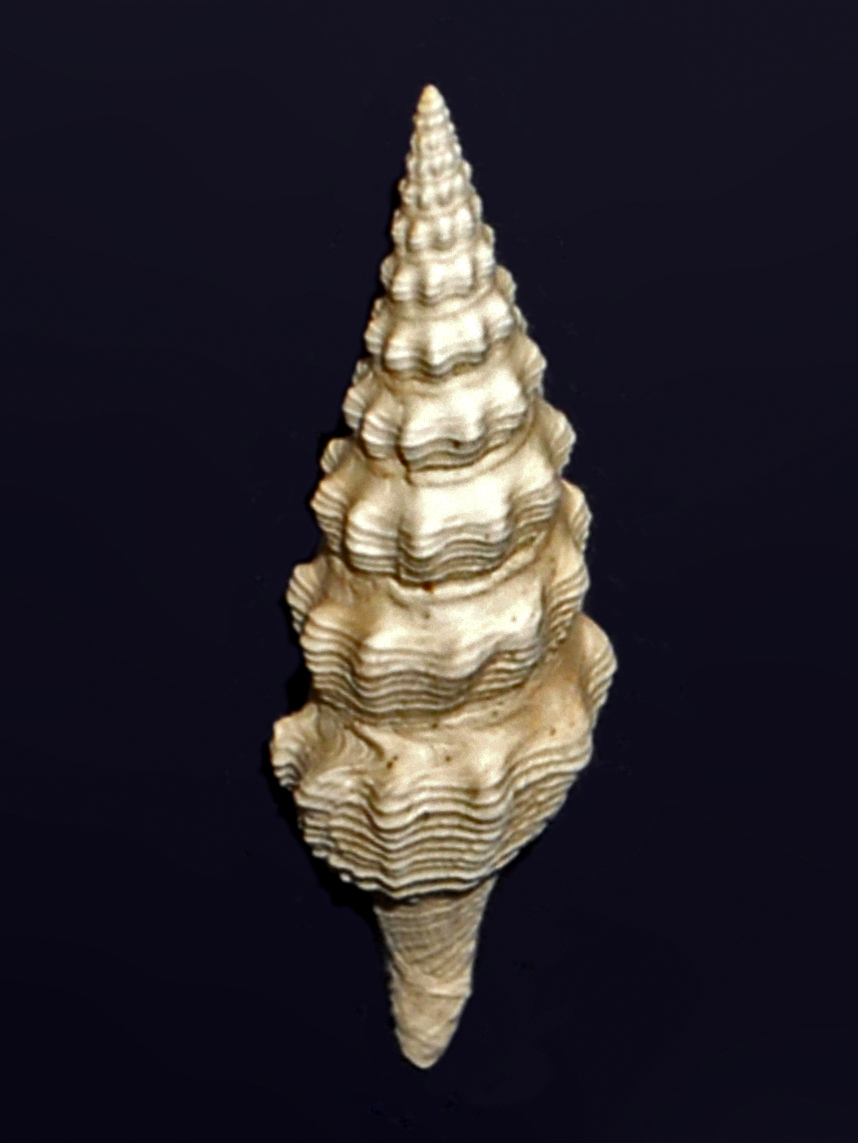
- Fossil shell of Stenodrillia bellardii from Pliocene of Italy

Scientific classification
- Kingdom: Animalia
- Phylum: Mollusca
- Class: Gastropoda
- Subclass: Caenogastropoda
- Order: Neogastropoda
- Superfamily: Conoidea
- Family: Drilliidae
- Genus: Stenodrillia; Korobkov, 1955

Type species
- =

Species
- See text

= Stenodrillia =

Stenodrillia Temporal range: Oligocene–Pliocene

Genus of gastropods

Stenodrillia is a genus of sea snails, marine gastropod mollusks in the family Drilliidae.

== Fossil records ==
This genus is known in the fossil records from the Oligocene to the Pliocene (age range: from 28.4 to 2.588 million years ago). Fossils are found in the marine strata of Italy, Austria, Denmark and Hungary.

== Description ==
Species within this genus can reach a size of about 3.5–60 millimetres (0.14–2.36 in).

== Species ==
Species within the genus Stenodrillia include:

- † Stenodrillia bellardii Des Moulins 1842
- Stenodrillia horrenda (Watson, 1886)
- † Stenodrillia obeliscus Desmoulins 1842

Species brought into synonymy

- Stenodrillia acestra (Dall, 1889): synonym of Compsodrillia acestra (Dall, 1889)
- Stenodrillia eucosmia (Dall, 1889): synonym of Compsodrillia eucosmia (Dall, 1889)
- Stenodrillia gundlachi (Dall & Simpson, 1901): synonym of Compsodrillia gundlachi (Dall & Simpson, 1901)
- Stenodrillia haliostrephis (Dall, 1889): synonym of Compsodrillia haliostrephis (Dall, 1889)
