= Carinodrillia cymatoides =

Scientific classification
- Kingdom: Animalia
- Phylum: Mollusca
- Class: Gastropoda
- Subclass: Caenogastropoda
- Order: Neogastropoda
- Superfamily: Conoidea
- Family: Pseudomelatomidae
- Genus: Carinodrillia
- Species: C. cymatoides

Binomial name
- Carinodrillia cymatoides J. Gardner, 1938

Extinct species of gastropod

Carinodrillia cymatoides is an extinct species of sea snail, a marine gastropod mollusk in the family Pseudomelatomidae, the turrids and allies.

J. Gardner was of the opinion that this species was a possible precursor of Compsodrillia eucosmia (W.H. Dall, 1889), a Recent species that she thought belonging to Carinodrillia.

== Description ==
The length of the shell attains 16 mm, its diameter 5.5 mm.

== Distribution ==
This extinct species occurred in Miocene strata of the Alum Bluff Formation, Florida, United States.
