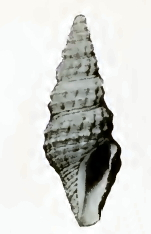
- Compsodrillia nana

Scientific classification
- Kingdom: Animalia
- Phylum: Mollusca
- Class: Gastropoda
- Subclass: Caenogastropoda
- Order: Neogastropoda
- Superfamily: Conoidea
- Family: Pseudomelatomidae
- Genus: Compsodrillia; Woodring, 1928

Species
- See text

= Compsodrillia =

Genus of gastropods

Compsodrillia is a genus of sea snails, marine gastropod mollusks in the family Pseudomelatomidae, the turrids and allies.

== Species ==
Species within the genus Compsodrillia include:

- Compsodrillia acestra (Dall, 1889)
- Compsodrillia albonodosa (Carpenter, 1857)
- Compsodrillia alcestis (Dall, 1919)
- Compsodrillia bicarinata (Shasky, 1961)
- Compsodrillia canna (Dall, 1889)
- † Compsodrillia catherina W.P. Woodring, 1928
- Compsodrillia disticha Bartsch, 1934
- † Compsodrillia drewi (Gardner, 1948)
- Compsodrillia duplicata (Sowerby I, 1834)
- Compsodrillia eucosmia (Dall, 1889)
- Compsodrillia excentrica (Sowerby I, 1834)
- Compsodrillia fanoa (Dall, 1927)
- † Compsodrillia foruita MacNeil, 1960
- Compsodrillia gonae Jong & Coomans, 1988
- Compsodrillia gracilis McLean & Poorman, 1971
- Compsodrillia gundlachi (Dall & Simpson, 1901)
- Compsodrillia haliostrephis (Dall, 1889)
- Compsodrillia haliplexa (Dall, 1919)
- Compsodrillia jaculum (Pilsbry & Lowe, 1932)
- Compsodrillia mammillata Kuroda, Habe & Oyama, 1971
- Compsodrillia nakamurai J. Makiyama, 1931
- Compsodrillia nana Bartsch, 1934
- Compsodrillia olssoni McLean & Poorman, 1971
- Compsodrillia opaca McLean & Poorman, 1971
- Compsodrillia petersoni Bartsch, 1934
- † Compsodrillia senaria W.P. Woodring, 1928
- Compsodrillia thestia (Dall, 1919)
- † Compsodrillia torvita F.S. MacNeil, 1960
- † Compsodrillia tricatenaria (T.A. Conrad, 1862)
- Compsodrillia tristicha (Dall, 1889)
- Compsodrillia undatichorda McLean & Poorman, 1971
- † Compsodrillia urceola W.P. Woodring, 1928

Species brought into synonymy

- † Compsodrillia chowanensis Gardner, 1948: synonym of † Sediliopsis chowanensis (J. Gardner, 1948)
- Compsodrillia halis H.A. Pilsbry & H.N. Lowe, 1932: synonym of Compsodrillia albonodosa (Carpenter, 1857)
- Compsodrillia polytorta (Dall, 1881): synonym of Hindsiclava polytorta (Dall, 1881)
