= Carinodrillia apitoa =

Scientific classification
- Kingdom: Animalia
- Phylum: Mollusca
- Class: Gastropoda
- Subclass: Caenogastropoda
- Order: Neogastropoda
- Superfamily: Conoidea
- Family: Pseudomelatomidae
- Genus: Carinodrillia
- Species: C. apitoa

Binomial name
- Carinodrillia apitoa L.F. Corea, 1934

Synonyms
- Carinodrillia (Buchema) apitoa Corea, 1934 (original combination)

Species of gastropod

Carinodrillia apitoa is a species of sea snail, a marine gastropod mollusk in the family Pseudomelatomidae.

== Description ==
The length of the shell attains 10 mm.

(Original description, Corea, LF) C. apitoa has a medium-sized, yellow, elongate-conic shell. Its protoconch is composed of two smooth whorls followed by 0.3 whorls with axial lirae that transition into evenly-spaced axial riblets. Its five teleoconch whorls have wide humplike axial ribs, eight on the first two, nine on the third and fourth, and eight on the body whorl. Beginning on the second whorl, there is a moderately strong cord anterior to the summit. From the third whorl on, the spiral sculpture consists of two spiral cords that pass over the axial ribs, separated by two smaller spiral cords. There are fine spiral lirations on the posterior sinal region and between the cords anterior to the sinus. It has a short, moderately round base with three spiral cords separated by five and four spiral lirae. The columella have six strong, widely-spaced spiral lirae separated by smaller spiral lirae. It has a pear-shaped aperture, strongly channeled anteriorly and posteriorly, with the outer lip protracted into a clawlike element between the anterior limit of the posterior sinus and the stromboid notch, and with a heavy varix behind its edge. The inner lip is reflected over the columella as a heavy callus which extends over the parietal wall and forms a knob at its junction with the outer lip.

== Distribution ==
This marine species occurs off Puerto Rico
