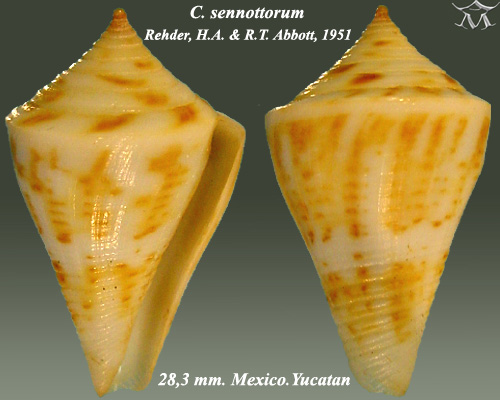
- Apertural and abapertural views of shell of Conus sennottorum Rehder, H.A. & R.T. Abbott, 1951

Conservation status
- Least Concern (IUCN 3.1)

Scientific classification
- Kingdom: Animalia
- Phylum: Mollusca
- Class: Gastropoda
- Subclass: Caenogastropoda
- Order: Neogastropoda
- Superfamily: Conoidea
- Family: Conidae
- Genus: Conus
- Species: C. sennottorum

Binomial name
- Conus sennottorum Rehder & Abbott, 1951

Synonyms
- Conasprella sennottorum (Rehder & Abbott, 1951); Conus (Dauciconus) sennottorum Rehder & Abbott, 1951 · accepted, alternate representation; Gradiconus sennottorum (Rehder & Abbott, 1951)

= Conus sennottorum =

Species of sea snail

Conus sennottorum, common name Sennett's cone, is a species of sea snail, a marine gastropod mollusk in the family Conidae, the cone snails and their allies.

Like all species within the genus Conus, these snails are predatory and venomous. They are capable of stinging humans, therefore live ones should be handled carefully or not at all.

== Distribution ==
Locus typicus: "Off Campeche, Yucatan, Mexico."

This species occurs in the Caribbean Sea and in the Gulf of Mexico., from West Florida to Venezuela.

== Description ==
The maximum recorded shell length is 46 mm.

== Type material ==
"Holotype and paratypes in United States National Museum, Washington. Also paratypes in collection Sennott. The holotype and one paratype were figured by Clench (1953: pl. 185, figs 1,2) and Abbott (1974: 255, fig. 2786)."

== Habitat ==
Minimum recorded depth is 26 m. Maximum recorded depth is 106 m.
