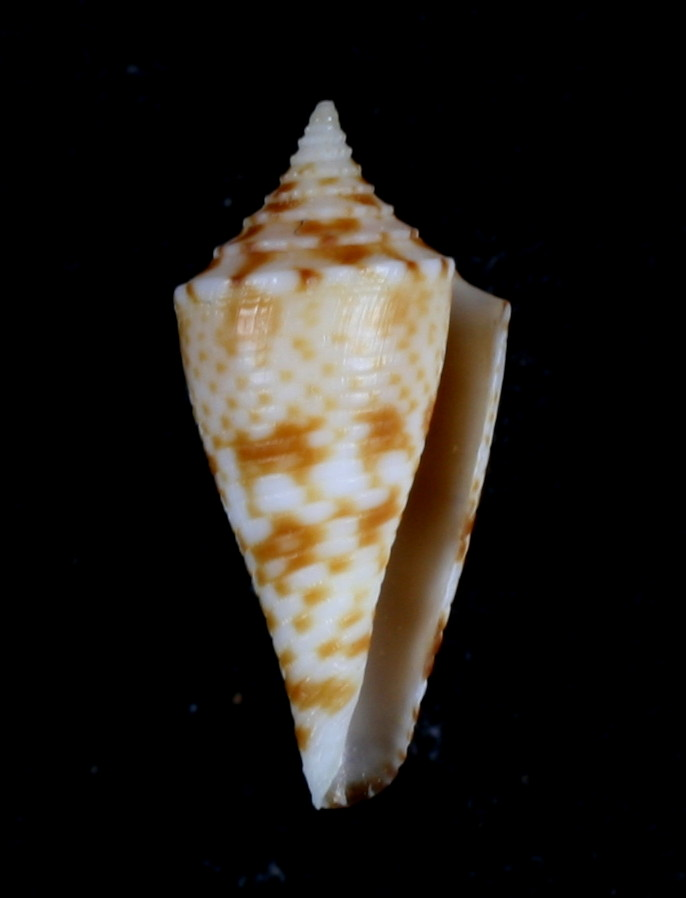
- Apertural view of shell of Conasprella eugrammata (Bartch & Rehder, 1943), measuring 19.9 mm in height, trawled at 80 fms. off Aliguay Island, in the Philippines

Scientific classification
- Kingdom: Animalia
- Phylum: Mollusca
- Class: Gastropoda
- Subclass: Caenogastropoda
- Order: Neogastropoda
- Superfamily: Conoidea
- Family: Conidae
- Genus: Conasprella
- Species: C. eugrammata

Binomial name
- Conasprella eugrammata (Bartsch & Rehder, 1943)

Synonyms
- Conasprella (Conasprella) eugrammata (Bartsch & Rehder, 1943) · accepted, alternate representation; Conus eugrammatus Bartsch & Rehder, 1943 (original combination ); Conus lapulapui da Motta & Martin, 1982; Conus nasui Ninomiya, 1974

= Conasprella eugrammata =

Species of gastropod

Conasprella eugrammata, common name the eugrammatus cone, is a species of sea snail, a marine gastropod mollusk in the family Conidae, the cone snails and their allies.

Like all species within the genus Conasprella, these snails are predatory and venomous. They are capable of stinging humans, therefore live ones should be handled carefully or not at all.

== Description ==
The size of an adult shell varies between 21 mm and 40 mm. Conical in shape, and has a slightly elevated spine. Fresh shells have a whitish grey periostracum, which form thin lamellae on the riblets of the spire. Denuded specimens have a pale ground colour and regular brown spots mark the whorls on the spire.

== Distribution ==
This species occurs in the Pacific Ocean off Hawaii, from Japan to the Philippines, off Queensland, Australia and in the Indian Ocean off KwaZulu-Natal, South Africa, and possibly Madagascar as well.

== Gallery ==
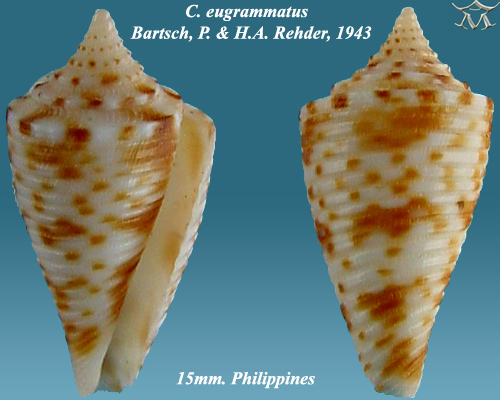
Conasprella eugrammata (Bartsch, P. & H.A. Rehder, 1943)

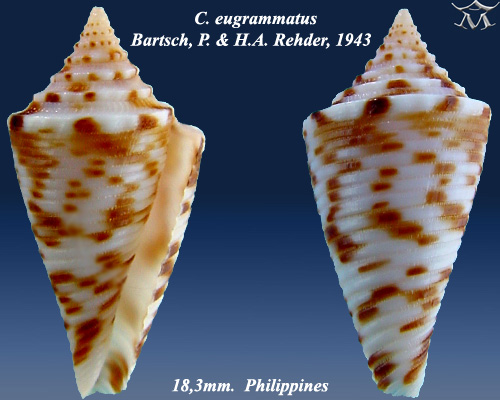
Conasprella eugrammata (Bartsch, P. & H.A. Rehder, 1943)
