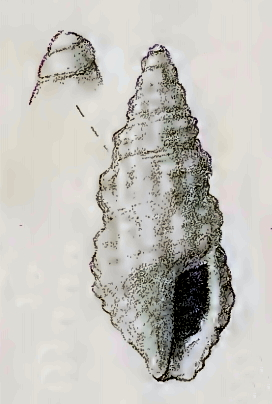
- Shell of Buchema primula

Scientific classification
- Kingdom: Animalia
- Phylum: Mollusca
- Class: Gastropoda
- Subclass: Caenogastropoda
- Order: Neogastropoda
- Superfamily: Conoidea
- Family: Horaiclavidae
- Genus: Buchema; Corea, 1934

Type species
- Carinodrillia tainoa Corea, 1934

Species
- See text

= Buchema =

Genus of gastropods

Buchema is a genus of sea snails, marine gastropod mollusks in the family Horaiclavidae.

This genus was previously placed in the subfamily Crassispirinae, within the Turridae.

== Description ==
(Description by W.H. Dall as a subgenus of Carinodrillia) This genus consists of moderate-sized, rather heavy shelled mollusks which resemble the members of the genus Carinodrillia. They differ from Carinodrillia in having the whorls of the protoconch without a median carina. Here they are rounded, the early whorls smooth, succeeded by a finely axially, closely lirate portion that passes into an axially slender ribbed part, which in turn passes into the postnuclear sculpture. The sculpture of the postnuclear whorls consists of strong axial ribs which weaken on the posterior sinus. The axial ribs and intercostal spaces are crossed by rather heavy spiral cords, finer spiral lirations between the heavier cords, and hairlike incremental lines. The combination of these last two elements produces a fine clothlike pattern, while their junction sometimes almost appears granulose. The columella is stout, and there is a weak umbilical chink at its anterior termination. The aperture is rather short, deeply channeled anteriorly and posteriorly, the posterior sinus falling a little anterior to the summit. The outer lip is protracted into a clawlike element between the anterior limit of the posterior sinus and the stromboid notch.

== Species ==
Species within the genus Buchema include:

- Buchema bellula (E. A. Smith, 1882)
- Buchema dichroma Kilburn, 1988
- Buchema granulosa (Sowerby I, 1834)
- Buchema hadromeres (Melvill, 1927)
- Buchema interpleura (Dall & Simpson, 1901)
- Buchema interstrigata (Smith E. A., 1882)
- Buchema liella (Corea, 1934)
- Buchema melanacme (E. A. Smith, 1882)
- Buchema nigra Fallon, 2010
- Buchema primula (Melvill, 1923)
- Buchema shearmani Morassi & Bonfitto, 2013
- Buchema tainoa (Corea, 1934)
