= Compsodrillia canna =

Scientific classification
- Kingdom: Animalia
- Phylum: Mollusca
- Class: Gastropoda
- Subclass: Caenogastropoda
- Order: Neogastropoda
- Superfamily: Conoidea
- Family: Pseudomelatomidae
- Genus: Compsodrillia
- Species: C. canna

Binomial name
- Compsodrillia canna (Dall, 1889)

Synonyms
- Drillia eucosmia var. canna Dall, 1889; Lioglyphostoma canna (Dall, 1889)

Species of gastropod

Compsodrillia canna, common name the reed turrid, is a species of sea snail, a marine gastropod mollusc in the family Pseudomelatomidae, the turrids and allies.

== Description ==
The length of the shell varies between 5.5 mm and 20 mm.

(Original description) Compared to Compsodrillia eucosmia, the shell is smaller and more slender. The peripheral primary spirals number always three. The secondary spirals are few or obsolete. The ribs number six or seven and are rather more prominent.§

== Distribution ==
C. canna can be found in Atlantic waters, ranging from the coast of North Carolina to the Lesser Antilles.
