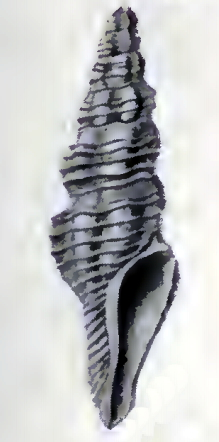
- Original image of a shell of Carinodrillia winchesterae

Scientific classification
- Kingdom: Animalia
- Phylum: Mollusca
- Class: Gastropoda
- Subclass: Caenogastropoda
- Order: Neogastropoda
- Superfamily: Conoidea
- Family: Pseudomelatomidae
- Genus: Carinodrillia
- Species: C. winchesterae

Binomial name
- Carinodrillia winchesterae (Pilsbry, 1922)

Synonyms
- Drillia winchesterae Pilsbry, 1922

= Carinodrillia winchesterae =

Extinct species of gastropod

Carinodrillia winchesterae is an extinct species of sea snail, a marine gastropod mollusk in the family Pseudomelatomidae, the turrids and allies.

== Description ==
The length of the holotype attains (the early whorls lost) 26.5 mm, its diameter 8.3 mm; 6 1/2 whorls remaining.

(Original description) This species is very similar to Carinodrillia elocata, but it is more slender with a longer anterior canal and a deeper posterior sinus. The anal fasciole and the spaces between the spiral ridges are distinctly striate spirally, with in each interval about 6 striae. There are seven broad, rounded axial folds on the penultimate whorl and on the body whorl, weakening on the anal fasciole. On the face of the body whorl there are 18 narrow, high spiral ridges, a smaller cord above the upper one and a strong, acute cord below the suture. The outer lip is smooth within. The inner lip is a little raised. The anal sinus is deep, rounded posteriorly and contracted a little anteriorly.

== Distribution ==
Fossils of this marine species were found in Tertiary strata of the Dominican Republic.
