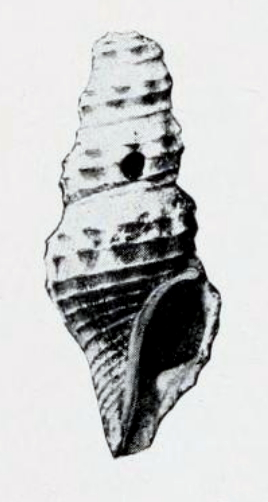
- Original image of a shell of Carinodrillia zooki

Scientific classification
- Kingdom: Animalia
- Phylum: Mollusca
- Class: Gastropoda
- Subclass: Caenogastropoda
- Order: Neogastropoda
- Superfamily: Conoidea
- Family: Pseudomelatomidae
- Genus: Carinodrillia
- Species: C. zooki

Binomial name
- Carinodrillia zooki (Brown and Pilsbry 1911)

Synonyms
- Drillia (Crassispira) zooki (Brown and Pilsbry 1911); Drillia zooki Brown and Pilsbry 1911 (original combination)

= Carinodrillia zooki =

Extinct species of gastropod

Carinodrillia zooki is an extinct species of sea snail, a marine gastropod mollusk in the family Pseudomelatomidae, the turrids and allies.

== Description ==
The length of the shell attains 20.5 mm, its diameter 8.5 mm.

This species is very similar to † Carinodrillia fusiformis (Gabb, 1873), but differs in many respects. The anterior canal is much shorter. There is no cord at the lower edge of the sutural fasciole, above the supraperipheral cord. There are eleven somewhat protractive longitudinal folds on the body whorl, which are narrower than in C. fusilformis. In other respects, the two species seem to be substantially alike.

== Distribution ==
Fossils of this marine species were found in Miocene strata of the Gatun Formation in Panama.
