= Carinodrillia lachrymosa =

Scientific classification
- Kingdom: Animalia
- Phylum: Mollusca
- Class: Gastropoda
- Subclass: Caenogastropoda
- Order: Neogastropoda
- Superfamily: Conoidea
- Family: Pseudomelatomidae
- Genus: Carinodrillia
- Species: C. lachrymosa

Binomial name
- Carinodrillia lachrymosa McLean & Poorman, 1971

Species of gastropod

Carinodrillia lachrymosa is a species of sea snail, a marine gastropod mollusk in the family Pseudomelatomidae, the turrids and allies.

== Distribution ==
This species occurs in the Pacific Ocean from Mexico to Panama.
