= Carinodrillia pilsbryi =

Scientific classification
- Kingdom: Animalia
- Phylum: Mollusca
- Class: Gastropoda
- Subclass: Caenogastropoda
- Order: Neogastropoda
- Superfamily: Conoidea
- Family: Pseudomelatomidae
- Genus: Carinodrillia
- Species: C. pilsbryi

Binomial name
- Carinodrillia pilsbryi (Lowe, H.N., 1935)

Species of gastropod

Carinodrillia pilsbryi is a species of sea snail, a marine gastropod mollusk in the family Pseudomelatomidae, the turrids and allies.

== Description ==
The length of the shell varies between 23 mm and 50 mm.

== Distribution ==
This species occurs from the Sea of Cortez, Western Mexico to Peru.
