= Carinodrillia fermori =

Scientific classification
- Kingdom: Animalia
- Phylum: Mollusca
- Class: Gastropoda
- Subclass: Caenogastropoda
- Order: Neogastropoda
- Superfamily: Conoidea
- Family: Pseudomelatomidae
- Genus: Carinodrillia
- Species: C. fermori

Binomial name
- Carinodrillia fermori Dey 1961

Extinct species of gastropod

Carinodrillia fermori is an extinct species of sea snail, a marine gastropod mollusk in the family Pseudomelatomidae, the turrids and allies.

== Distribution ==
This extinct species occurs in Miocene strata in the Quilon Formation, Kerala, India; age range: 23.03 to 15.97 Ma
