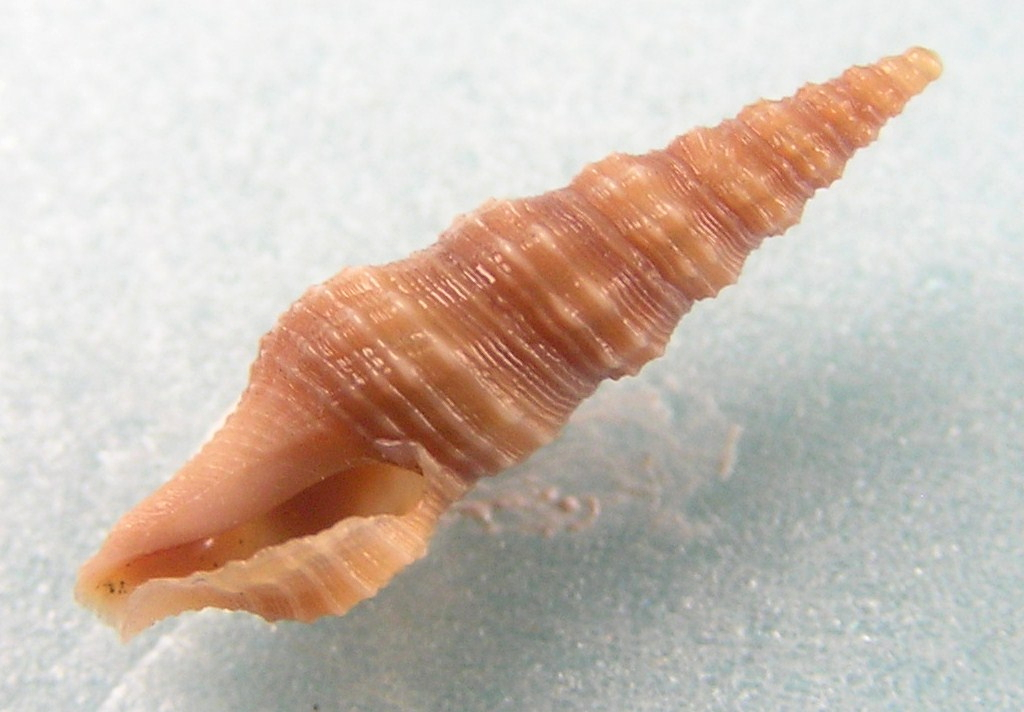
- Apertural view of a shell of Carinodrillia braziliensis

Scientific classification
- Kingdom: Animalia
- Phylum: Mollusca
- Class: Gastropoda
- Subclass: Caenogastropoda
- Order: Neogastropoda
- Superfamily: Conoidea
- Family: Pseudomelatomidae
- Genus: Carinodrillia
- Species: C. braziliensis

Binomial name
- Carinodrillia braziliensis (E.A. Smith, 1915)

Synonyms
- Drillia braziliensis E.A. Smith, 1915

= Carinodrillia braziliensis =

Species of gastropod

Carinodrillia braziliensis is a species of sea snail, a marine gastropod mollusk in the family Pseudomelatomidae, the turrids.

== Description ==
The length of the shell varies between 13 mm and 30 mm.

The slender, fusiform shell is light brown with whitish nodules. It contains 11 whorls, slowly increasing. The two apical whorls are smooth, forming a large rounded protoconch. The following whorls are longitudinally obliquely costate. The ribs are most prominent at the middle of the whorls, where they are crossed by two spiral lines, which form transversely elongate nodules upon them. A wavy carina passes along the upper margin of the whorls, and a finer thread borders the lower suture. On the body whorl, the ribs are produced downwards below the middle but do not extend quite to the end of the rostrum. The spirals number about eighteen, and about seven of the upper ones are more or less nodulous on crossing the ribs; the rest below are finer and smooth. Between the nodulous lirae, both on the spire and on the body whorl, there are fine threadlike lines, and the whole surface exhibits delicate wavy growth-striae. The aperture is brown within, not quite one-third the length of the shell. The outer lip is thin at the edge, distinctly sinuate below the sutural keel, and has a rib or varix, larger than the other ribs on the outside. The columella is straightish, covered with a pale callus formed into a tubercle at the sinus.

== Distribution ==
This species occurs in the Atlantic Ocean off Eastern Brazil to Uruguay.
