= Compsodrillia torvita =

Scientific classification
- Kingdom: Animalia
- Phylum: Mollusca
- Class: Gastropoda
- Subclass: Caenogastropoda
- Order: Neogastropoda
- Superfamily: Conoidea
- Family: Pseudomelatomidae
- Genus: Compsodrillia
- Species: C. torvita

Binomial name
- Compsodrillia torvita MacNeil, 1960

Extinct species of gastropod

Compsodrillia torvita is an extinct species of sea snail, a marine gastropod mollusk in the family Pseudomelatomidae, the turrids and allies.

== Description ==
The length of the shell attains 38 mm.

== Distribution ==
Fossils have been found in the Miocene strata of the Shimajiri Formation of Okinawa.
