= Buchema dichroma =

Scientific classification
- Kingdom: Animalia
- Phylum: Mollusca
- Class: Gastropoda
- Subclass: Caenogastropoda
- Order: Neogastropoda
- Superfamily: Conoidea
- Family: Horaiclavidae
- Genus: Buchema
- Species: B. dichroma

Binomial name
- Buchema dichroma Kilburn, 1988

Species of gastropod

Buchema dichroma is a species of sea snail, a marine gastropod mollusk in the family Horaiclavidae.

It was formerly included within the family Turridae.

== Distribution ==
This marine species occurs off Southeast Africa.
