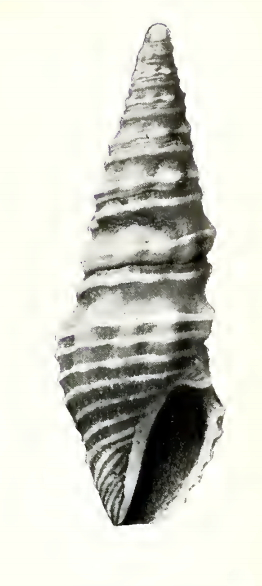
- Original image of a shell of Compsodrillia thestia

Scientific classification
- Kingdom: Animalia
- Phylum: Mollusca
- Class: Gastropoda
- Subclass: Caenogastropoda
- Order: Neogastropoda
- Superfamily: Conoidea
- Family: Pseudomelatomidae
- Genus: Compsodrillia
- Species: C. thestia

Binomial name
- Compsodrillia thestia (Dall, 1919)

Synonyms
- Clathrodrillia thestia Dall, 1919; Clathrodrillia (Carinodrillia) thestia Dall, 1919 (original combination)

= Compsodrillia thestia =

Species of gastropod

Compsodrillia thestia is a species of sea snail, a marine gastropod mollusk in the family Pseudomelatomidae, the turrids and allies.

== Description ==
The length of the shell attains 14 mm, its diameter 5 mm.

(Original description) The slender, acute shell is strongly sculptured, with pale brownish clouding on a yellowish white ground. The protoconch is smooth, inflated, and consists of 1½ whorl, followed by about eight sculptured whorls. The suture is distinct, undulated, strongly appressed, thick-edged, with a strong cord immediately behind the strongly constricted smooth anal fasciole. Other spiral sculpture consists of (on the spire one or two) strong peripheral cords, swollen and almost angulated where they override the ribs. On the body whorl there are six or seven cords with much wider interspaces and as many more smaller close-set threads on the siphonal canal. The axial sculpture consists of seven or eight very prominent short ribs on the penultimate whorl; fading out on the body whorl, and rather prominent widely spaced incremental lines most conspicuous on the body whorl. The aperture is subovate. The anal sulcus is conspicuous, rounded, with a marked subsutural callus. The outer lip is thin, moderately arcuate, not varicose. The inner lip shows a coat of enamel with the anterior edge raised. The columella is short, straight. The siphonal canal is hardly differentiated from the aperture.

== Distribution ==
This marine species occurs in the Sea of Cortez, Western Mexico.
