= Buchema granulosa =

Scientific classification
- Kingdom: Animalia
- Phylum: Mollusca
- Class: Gastropoda
- Subclass: Caenogastropoda
- Order: Neogastropoda
- Superfamily: Conoidea
- Family: Horaiclavidae
- Genus: Buchema
- Species: B. granulosa

Binomial name
- Buchema granulosa (Sowerby I, 1834)

Synonyms
- Crassispira granulosa Sowerby I, 1834; Pleurotoma granulosa Sowerby I, 1834

Species of gastropod

Buchema granulosa is a species of sea snail, a marine gastropod mollusk in the family Horaiclavidae.

The species was previously assigned to the family Turridae.

== Description ==
The length of the shell attains 11 mm.

== Distribution ==
This species occurs in the Pacific Ocean off Costa Rica and Panama.
