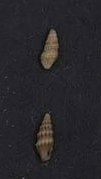
- Shell of Buchema melanacme (specimen at Naturalis Biodiversity Center)

Scientific classification
- Kingdom: Animalia
- Phylum: Mollusca
- Class: Gastropoda
- Subclass: Caenogastropoda
- Order: Neogastropoda
- Superfamily: Conoidea
- Family: Horaiclavidae
- Genus: Buchema
- Species: B. melanacme

Binomial name
- Buchema melanacme (E. A. Smith, 1882)

Synonyms
- Pleurotoma (Crassispira) melanacme E. A. Smith, 1882; Sedilia melanacme (E. A. Smith, 1882)

= Buchema melanacme =

Species of gastropod

Buchema melanacme is a species of sea snail, a marine gastropod mollusk in the family Horaiclavidae.

It was formerly included within the family Turridae.

== Description ==
The length of the elongate-ovate, black shell attains 8 mm, its diameter 3 mm. The shell contains 7 1/2 whorls of which 1 1/2 are in the protoconch. The upper half of each whorl is concave, and not crossed by the ribs, which are situated below. Of the three spiral lirations which connect the ribs, the upper one is rather more slender than the others. There is a slight thickening just below the suture. The body whorl contains 15 spiral ribs. The small aperture is red and measures a third of the total length of the shell. The sinus is small and is slightly situated below the suture. The siphonal canal is very short.

== Distribution ==
This marine species occurs in the Caribbean Sea off Saint Vincent.
