= Sediliopsis angulata =

Scientific classification
- Kingdom: Animalia
- Phylum: Mollusca
- Class: Gastropoda
- Subclass: Caenogastropoda
- Order: Neogastropoda
- Superfamily: Conoidea
- Family: Pseudomelatomidae
- Genus: Sediliopsis
- Species: S. angulata

Binomial name
- Sediliopsis angulata (Martin, 1904)

Synonyms
- Drillia incilifera var. angulata G.C. Martin, 1904

Extinct species of gastropod

Sediliopsis angulata is an extinct species of sea snail, a marine gastropod mollusk in the family Pseudomelatomidae, the turrids and allies.

== Description ==
The length of the shell attains 16 mm, its diameter 5–7 mm.

(Original description) The pyramidal shell is sharply pointed. The beak is short and curved. The sculpture shows distant obtuse ribs on the lower half. The suture is waved, with an impressed line above it. The body whorl is short, angular on the shoulder. The body whorl shows an impressed revolving line above and four raised revolving lines inferiorly. The upper sinus of outer lip is deep and rounded, lower obsolete.

== Distribution ==
Fossils of this species were found in Miocene Strata of the Chesapeake Bay, Maryland, USA.
