= Compsodrillia albonodosa =

Scientific classification
- Kingdom: Animalia
- Phylum: Mollusca
- Class: Gastropoda
- Subclass: Caenogastropoda
- Order: Neogastropoda
- Superfamily: Conoidea
- Family: Pseudomelatomidae
- Genus: Compsodrillia
- Species: C. albonodosa

Binomial name
- Compsodrillia albonodosa (Carpenter, 1857)

Synonyms
- Compsodrillia halis soror H.A. Pilsbry & H.N. Lowe, 1932; Drillia albonodosa Carpenter, 1857

Species of gastropod

Compsodrillia albonodosa is a species of sea snail, a marine gastropod mollusk in the family Pseudomelatomidae, the turrids and allies.

== Description ==
The length of the shell varies between 13 mm and 20 mm.

== Distribution ==
This species occurs in the Pacific Ocean off Mazatlan, Mexico.
