= Sediliopsis riosi =

Scientific classification
- Kingdom: Animalia
- Phylum: Mollusca
- Class: Gastropoda
- Subclass: Caenogastropoda
- Order: Neogastropoda
- Superfamily: Conoidea
- Family: Pseudomelatomidae
- Genus: Sediliopsis
- Species: S. riosi

Binomial name
- Sediliopsis riosi Tippett, 1995

Species of gastropod

Sediliopsis riosi is a species of sea snail, a marine gastropod mollusk in the family Pseudomelatomidae, the turrids and allies.

== Description ==
The length of the shell attains 15 mm (0.59 in).

== Distribution ==
This species occurs in the South Atlantic Ocean off Brazil.
