= Sediliopsis calvertensis =

Scientific classification
- Kingdom: Animalia
- Phylum: Mollusca
- Class: Gastropoda
- Subclass: Caenogastropoda
- Order: Neogastropoda
- Superfamily: Conoidea
- Family: Pseudomelatomidae
- Genus: Sediliopsis
- Species: S. calvertensis

Binomial name
- Sediliopsis calvertensis (Martin, 1904)

Synonyms
- Pleurotoma (Hemipleurotoma) calvertensis Martin 1904

Extinct species of gastropod

Sediliopsis calvertensis is an extinct species of sea snail, a marine gastropod mollusk in the family Pseudomelatomidae, the turrids and allies.

== Description ==
The length of the species attains 21 mm, its diameter 6 mm.

(Original description) The subfusiform shell is slender and contains eight whorls. The upper third of each whorl is flat, with two or three impressed spiral lines. The lower part is strongly convex, with rounded oblique ribs which are sometimes recurved at the upper end, and are usually crossed by about four faint, regular, impressed spiral lines and another stronger one above the suture. The body whorl shows about fifteen distinct impressed spirals below the costated shoulder. The lines of growth are strong, sweeping in broad curves around the notch which is on the shoulder. The surface is polished. The suture is impressed. The beak is short and slightly twisted.

== Distribution ==
Fossils of this species were found in Miocene Strata of the Chesapeake Bay, Maryland, USA.
