= Compsodrillia foruita =

Scientific classification
- Kingdom: Animalia
- Phylum: Mollusca
- Class: Gastropoda
- Subclass: Caenogastropoda
- Order: Neogastropoda
- Superfamily: Conoidea
- Family: Pseudomelatomidae
- Genus: Compsodrillia
- Species: C. foruita

Binomial name
- Compsodrillia foruita MacNeil, 1960

Extinct species of gastropod

Compsodrillia foruita is an extinct species of sea snail, a marine gastropod mollusk in the family Pseudomelatomidae, the turrids and allies.

== Distribution ==
Fossils have been found in the Shimajiri Formation of Okinawa
