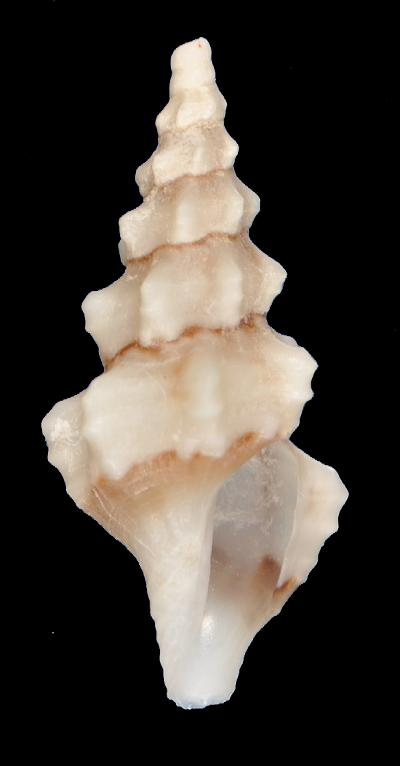
- Apertural view of a shell of Carinodrillia buccooensis

Scientific classification
- Kingdom: Animalia
- Phylum: Mollusca
- Class: Gastropoda
- Subclass: Caenogastropoda
- Order: Neogastropoda
- Superfamily: Conoidea
- Family: Pseudomelatomidae
- Genus: Carinodrillia
- Species: C. buccooensis

Binomial name
- Carinodrillia buccooensis Nowell-Usticke, 1971

= Carinodrillia buccooensis =

Species of gastropod

Carinodrillia buccooensis is a species of sea snail, a marine gastropod mollusk in the family Pseudomelatomidae. This species of sea snail is additionally a member of the Gastropoda class and the Caenogastropoda subclass which encompasses marine, brackish, fresh and terrestrial life

== Description ==
The shell is up to 18.1 mm in length. The sea snail is white in colour and is tainted with slight pink rings. The apertural view of the shell, shown in the image, displays this characteristic of the shell.

== Distribution ==
This species occurs in the Caribbean Sea off Tobago, Martinique and Guadeloupe.
