= Compsodrillia fanoa =

Scientific classification
- Kingdom: Animalia
- Phylum: Mollusca
- Class: Gastropoda
- Subclass: Caenogastropoda
- Order: Neogastropoda
- Superfamily: Conoidea
- Family: Pseudomelatomidae
- Genus: Compsodrillia
- Species: C. fanoa

Binomial name
- Compsodrillia fanoa (W. H. Dall, 1927)

Synonyms
- Clathrodrillia ? fanoa W. H. Dall, 1927

Species of gastropod

Compsodrillia excentrica is a species of sea snail, a marine gastropod mollusk in the family Pseudomelatomidae, the turrids and allies.

== Description ==
The length of the shell attains 7 mm, its diameter 3.1 mm.

(Original description) The small, white shell is strongly sculptured. The aperture is shorter than the spire. The smooth protoconch consists of a 1½ whorl and half and a whorl of transitional thin sharp axial riblets before the latter assume the adult characters on the four subsequent whorls. The suture is appressed. The fasciole in front of it is narrow and obscure. The whorls are well rounded. The axial sculpture consists of 13–14 rounded ribs (on the body whorl) with wider interspaces, crossing the whorls on the spire, obsolete on the base. Incremental hues are not conspicuous. The spiral sculpture consists of three strong cords, overriding the ribs; and about a dozen smaller plain threads on the base and the siphonal canal. The aperture is rather narrow. The anal sulcus is very shallow, outer lip sharp, protractively arcuate and thin. The columella is straight, somewhat gyrate but with an impervious axis; attenuated in front. The siphonal canal is rather long and wide.

== Distribution ==
This marine species occurs from Georgia to Florida, USA.
