= Compsodrillia olssoni =

Scientific classification
- Kingdom: Animalia
- Phylum: Mollusca
- Class: Gastropoda
- Subclass: Caenogastropoda
- Order: Neogastropoda
- Superfamily: Conoidea
- Family: Pseudomelatomidae
- Genus: Compsodrillia
- Species: C. olssoni

Binomial name
- Compsodrillia olssoni McLean & Poorman, 1971

Species of gastropod

Compsodrillia olssoni is a species of sea snail, a marine gastropod mollusk in the family Pseudomelatomidae, the turrids and allies.

== Description ==
The length of the shell attains 23 mm.

== Distribution ==
This species occurs in the Pacific Ocean from Panama to Ecuador.
