= Buchema liella =

Scientific classification
- Kingdom: Animalia
- Phylum: Mollusca
- Class: Gastropoda
- Subclass: Caenogastropoda
- Order: Neogastropoda
- Superfamily: Conoidea
- Family: Horaiclavidae
- Genus: Buchema
- Species: B. liella

Binomial name
- Buchema liella (Corea, 1934)

Synonyms
- Carinodrillia (Buchema) liella Corea, 1934

Species of gastropod

Buchema liella is a species of sea snail, a marine gastropod mollusk in the family Horaiclavidae.

It was formerly included within the family Turridae.

== Description ==
The length of the shell attains 15 mm, its diameter 5.5 mm.

== Distribution ==
This marine species occurs off the Dominican Republic, Puerto Rico and North Brazil
