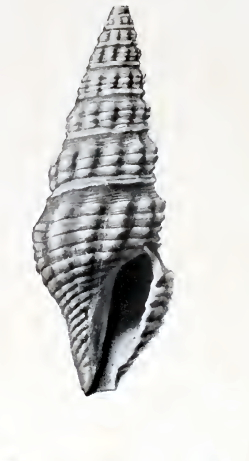
- Image of a shell of Compsodrillia tricatenaria

Scientific classification
- Kingdom: Animalia
- Phylum: Mollusca
- Class: Gastropoda
- Subclass: Caenogastropoda
- Order: Neogastropoda
- Superfamily: Conoidea
- Family: Pseudomelatomidae
- Genus: Compsodrillia
- Species: C. tricatenaria

Binomial name
- Compsodrillia tricatenaria (T.A. Conrad, 1862)

Synonyms
- † Drillia tricatenaria (T.A. Conrad, 1862); † Pleurotoma tricatenaria Conrad, 1834; † Surcula (Pleurotoma) tricatenaria Conrad, 1863; † Surcula tricatenaria Conrad, 1864

= Compsodrillia tricatenaria =

Extinct species of gastropod

Compsodrillia tricatenaria is an extinct species of sea snail, a marine gastropod mollusk in the family Pseudomelatomidae, the turrids and allies.

== Description ==
The length of the shell attains 17.5 mm, its diameter 6 mm.

The shell is subulate and turreted. It shows longitudinal undulations, which on each whorl of the spire are crossed by three equidistant prominent spiral lines. The whorls are indented above. The indentations are finely striated. The suture is margined by a carinated line. The body whorl shows about thirteen spiral lines. The aperture is more than one third the length of the shell. (original description by Conrad in 1834)

General Characters.—The shell is rather large and robust. The apertureis approximately one-third the total altitude. The whorls number probably 8 to 10. They are concave posteriorly, straight sided or gently convex in front of the fasciole. The body is smoothly contracted at the base. The appression of the whorls is rather marked. The suture line is inconspicuous.

Protoconch.—Apex broken away in all available material. The nucleus is apparently small.

Sculpture.- The external sculpture is vigorous, both axial and spiral. The axial ribs are rather strongly elevated, rounded, somewhat undulatory and slightly protractive, 12 to 14 in number on the later whorls, persisting with undiminished strength to the anterior suture but quite abruptly evanescent posteriorly at the margin of the fasciole. On the body whorl they are weakening a little in front of the periphery and becoming obsolete before reaching the pillar and, in the older forms, irregular or altogether obsolete toward the aperture. Intercostal areas are concave, narrower than the ribs. The spiral sculpture consists of broadly arched, rather prominent, primary fillets, uniform in strength on both the costal and the intercostal areas, 9 to 11 in number on the ultima, 3 or 4 upon the penultima, usually, though not always, equal or sub-equal in size and spacing. The intercalaries are absent in the type but present, as a rule, to the number of 1, 2, or 3 between the primaries of the later whorls. The posterior fasciole is obscurely undulated anteriorly by the axial sculpture, spirally threaded with 4 to 6 fine, close-set lirae with 1 or 2 stronger cords at the posterior margin, directly in front of the suture line. The anterior canal is sculptured with 4 to 6 crowded lirae. Aperture : the aperture is narrow, obliquely lobate, obtusely angulated at the posterior commissure. The outer lip is somewhat flaring. The posterior siphonal notch is very narrow, but rather deep. The inner lip is gently excavated at the base of the body whorl. The columella is straight, moderately long, simple. The parietal wall and the columella are heavily reinforced. The anterior canal is rather long and broad, obtusely truncate at the extremity.

== Distribution ==
Fossils have been found in Upper Miocene strata of South Carolina, USA.
