= Carinodrillia dichroa =

Scientific classification
- Kingdom: Animalia
- Phylum: Mollusca
- Class: Gastropoda
- Subclass: Caenogastropoda
- Order: Neogastropoda
- Superfamily: Conoidea
- Family: Pseudomelatomidae
- Genus: Carinodrillia
- Species: C. dichroa

Binomial name
- Carinodrillia dichroa Pilsbry & H. N. Lowe, 1932

Species of gastropod

Carinodrillia dichroa, common name the two-toned turrid, is a species of sea snail, a marine gastropod mollusk in the family Pseudomelatomidae.

== Description ==
The shell has a spiral structure, with a commonly off-white colouration above the periphery on the upper half of the whorl, and dark brown below it. It has a narrow brown band above the suture with a moderately developed spiral sculpture in comparison with other species of the genus Carinodrillia. The length of the shell varies between 15 mm and 26 mm.

== Distribution ==
This marine species occurs from the Sea of Cortez, West Mexico to Ecuador, at a depth of 10 to 40 m. It is found on gravel bottoms near rock.
