= Sediliopsis patuxentia =

Scientific classification
- Kingdom: Animalia
- Phylum: Mollusca
- Class: Gastropoda
- Subclass: Caenogastropoda
- Order: Neogastropoda
- Superfamily: Conoidea
- Family: Pseudomelatomidae
- Genus: Sediliopsis
- Species: S. patuxentia

Binomial name
- Sediliopsis patuxentia (Martin, 1904)

Synonyms
- Pleurotoma (Hemipleurotoma) calvertensis Martin 1904

Extinct species of gastropod

Sediliopsis patuxentia is an extinct species of sea snail, a marine gastropod mollusk in the family Pseudomelatomidae, the turrids and allies.

== Distribution ==
Fossils of this species were found in Miocene Strata of the Chesapeake Bay, Maryland, USA.
