= Sediliopsis incilifera =

Scientific classification
- Kingdom: Animalia
- Phylum: Mollusca
- Class: Gastropoda
- Subclass: Caenogastropoda
- Order: Neogastropoda
- Superfamily: Conoidea
- Family: Pseudomelatomidae
- Genus: Sediliopsis
- Species: S. incilifera

Binomial name
- Sediliopsis incilifera (Conrad, 1834)

Synonyms
- † Pleurotoma incilifera Conrad, 1834

Extinct species of gastropod

Sediliopsis incilifera is an extinct species of sea snail, a marine gastropod mollusk in the family Pseudomelatomidae.

== Description ==
The maximum length of the snail's shell was 16 mm.

== Distribution ==
Fossils of this species have been found in Miocene strata of Maryland, USA, dating back from 11.608 to 5.332 million years.
