= Carinodrillia felis =

Scientific classification
- Kingdom: Animalia
- Phylum: Mollusca
- Class: Gastropoda
- Subclass: Caenogastropoda
- Order: Neogastropoda
- Superfamily: Conoidea
- Family: Pseudomelatomidae
- Genus: Carinodrillia
- Species: C. felis

Binomial name
- Carinodrillia felis A.A. Olsson, 1964

Extinct species of gastropod

Carinodrillia felis is an extinct species of sea snail, a marine gastropod mollusk in the family Pseudomelatomidae, the turrids and allies.

== Distribution ==
This extinct species occurs in Pliocene strata and Miocene strata of Ecuador; age range: 5.332 to 3.6 Ma
