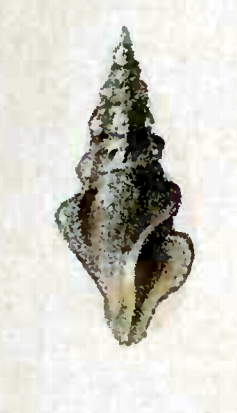
- Drawing of a shell of Carinodrillia hexagona

Scientific classification
- Kingdom: Animalia
- Phylum: Mollusca
- Class: Gastropoda
- Subclass: Caenogastropoda
- Order: Neogastropoda
- Superfamily: Conoidea
- Family: Pseudomelatomidae
- Genus: Carinodrillia
- Species: C. hexagona

Binomial name
- Carinodrillia hexagona (Sowerby I, 1834)

Synonyms
- Drillia hexagona (Sowerby I, 1834); Pleurotoma hexagona Sowerby I, 1834

= Carinodrillia hexagona =

Species of gastropod

Carinodrillia hexagona is a species of sea snail, a marine gastropod mollusk in the family Pseudomelatomidae, the turrids and allies

== Description ==
The length of the shell varies between 15 mm and 25 mm.

The reddish brown shell is sharply pyramidal. The hexagonal whorls are very finely striated, ribbed-tuberculated, the ribs six on each whorl. The sinus is broad.

== Distribution ==
This species occurs in the Pacific Ocean from Mexico to El Salvador.
