= Compsodrillia catherina =

Scientific classification
- Kingdom: Animalia
- Phylum: Mollusca
- Class: Gastropoda
- Subclass: Caenogastropoda
- Order: Neogastropoda
- Superfamily: Conoidea
- Family: Pseudomelatomidae
- Genus: Compsodrillia
- Species: C. catherina

Binomial name
- Compsodrillia catherina Woodring 1928

Extinct species of gastropod

Compsodrillia catherina is an extinct species of sea snail, a marine gastropod mollusk in the family Pseudomelatomidae, the turrids and allies. It was alive during the 2nd and 3rd periods of the Cenozoic Era (Neogene and Quaternary).

== Description ==
The length of the shell attains 7.8 mm; its diameter 2.9 mm. Although there are no photos that explicitly depict Compsodrillia catherina, based on the appearance of related species, we can conclude that it most likely had a pointed, spiraled shell and was orange and/or brown in color.

== Distribution ==
Fossils have been found in Pliocene strata of the Bowden Formation of Jamaica; also on Saint Thomas; age range: 3.6 to 2.588 Ma
