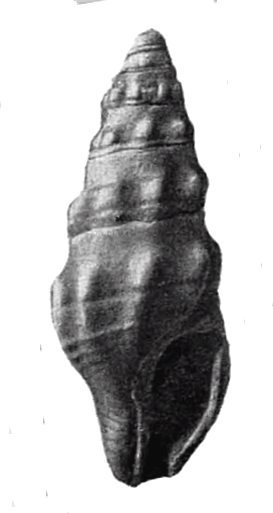
- Shell of † Sediliopsis distans

Scientific classification
- Kingdom: Animalia
- Phylum: Mollusca
- Class: Gastropoda
- Subclass: Caenogastropoda
- Order: Neogastropoda
- Superfamily: Conoidea
- Family: Pseudomelatomidae
- Genus: Sediliopsis
- Species: S. distans

Binomial name
- Sediliopsis distans (Conrad, 1862)

Synonyms
- † Drillia distans Conrad, 1862; † Drillia incilifera var. distans Martin, 1904

= Sediliopsis distans =

Extinct species of gastropod

Sediliopsis distans is an extinct species of sea snail, a marine gastropod mollusk in the family Pseudomelatomidae, the turrids and allies.

== Description ==
The length of the shell attains 21.5 mm, its diameter 8 mm.

(Original description) The turriculate shell contains six whorls. These are scalariform, with distant obtuse ribs on the lower half. The suture is waved, with an impressed line above it. The body whorl shows an impressed revolving line above and four raised revolving lines inferiorly. The upper sinus of the outer lip is deep and rounded, the lower obsolete.

== Distribution ==
Fossils of this species were found in Virginia, USA
