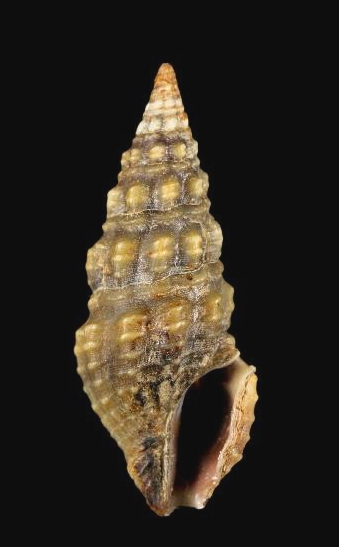
- Shell of Buchema hadromeres (specimen at MNHN, Paris)

Scientific classification
- Kingdom: Animalia
- Phylum: Mollusca
- Class: Gastropoda
- Subclass: Caenogastropoda
- Order: Neogastropoda
- Superfamily: Conoidea
- Family: Horaiclavidae
- Genus: Buchema
- Species: B. hadromeres

Binomial name
- Buchema hadromeres (Melvill, 1927)

Synonyms
- Melatoma hadromeres Melvill, 1927

= Buchema hadromeres =

Species of gastropod

Buchema hadromeres is a species of sea snail, a marine gastropod mollusk in the family Horaiclavidae.

It was formerly included within the family Turridae.

== Description ==
The length of the shell attains 14 mm.

== Distribution ==
This species occurs in the Caribbean Sea off Jamaica, Colombia, and Suriname.
