= Compsodrillia gonae =

Scientific classification
- Kingdom: Animalia
- Phylum: Mollusca
- Class: Gastropoda
- Subclass: Caenogastropoda
- Order: Neogastropoda
- Superfamily: Conoidea
- Family: Pseudomelatomidae
- Genus: Compsodrillia
- Species: C. gonae

Binomial name
- Compsodrillia gonae Jong & Coomans, 1988

Species of gastropod

Compsodrillia gonae is a species of sea snail, a marine gastropod mollusk in the family Pseudomelatomidae, the turrids and allies.

== Description ==
The length of the shell varies between 8 mm and 12 mm.

Compsodrillia gonae has a shell with two nuclear whorls and five postnuclear whorls. The whorls are marked by eight prominent rounded ribs, intersected by spiral cords with fine spiral threads filling the spaces in between. The shoulder of the shell is adorned with numerous fine spiral threads. The outer lip is thin, and the varix is faintly indicated by a slight swelling of the final axial rib. The shell is typically white in color.

== Distribution ==
This marine species occurs off the Dutch Antilles and Brazil.
