= Compsodrillia urceola =

Scientific classification
- Kingdom: Animalia
- Phylum: Mollusca
- Class: Gastropoda
- Subclass: Caenogastropoda
- Order: Neogastropoda
- Superfamily: Conoidea
- Family: Pseudomelatomidae
- Genus: Compsodrillia
- Species: C. urceola

Binomial name
- Compsodrillia urceola Woodring 1928

Extinct species of gastropod

Compsodrillia urceola is an extinct species of sea snail, a marine gastropod mollusk in the family Pseudomelatomidae, the turrids and allies.

== Description ==
The length of the shell attains 13.3 mm; its diameter is 4.2 mm.

== Distribution ==
Fossils have been found in Pliocene strata of the Bowden Formation of Jamaica; also on Saint Thomas; age range: 3.6 to 2.588 Ma.
