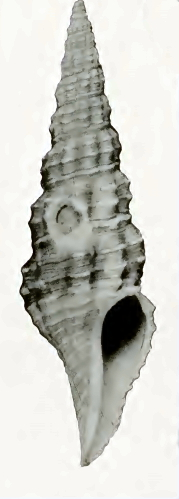
- Original image of a shell of Compsodrillia disticha

Scientific classification
- Kingdom: Animalia
- Phylum: Mollusca
- Class: Gastropoda
- Subclass: Caenogastropoda
- Order: Neogastropoda
- Superfamily: Conoidea
- Family: Pseudomelatomidae
- Genus: Compsodrillia
- Species: C. disticha

Binomial name
- Compsodrillia disticha Bartsch, 1934

= Compsodrillia disticha =

Species of gastropod

Compsodrillia disticha is a species of sea snail, a marine gastropod mollusk in the family Pseudomelatomidae.

== Description ==
The length of the shell attains 27 mm, its diameter 7.4 mm.

(Original description) The elongate-conic shell is covered with a very pale, ashy, dehiscent periostracum, which in the type is absent on the base and columella and gives the shell a decidedly bicolored effect, the shell itself appearing white. The protoconch contains 2.5 well rounded, smooth whorls, the last half crossed by a small number of axial riblets. The first postnuclear whorl has two nodulose spiral cords. On the next whorl these split into two and three tuberculated cords, the third one almost falling into the suture, being appressed to the cord at the summit of the succeeding whorls. These remain inconspicuous on the succeeding whorls, while the other two occupying the middle portion of the shell become decidedly pronounced. The cord at the summit forms an abrupt sloping shoulder, and the space between this and the first strong spiral cord constitutes the sulcus marking the posterior channel of the shell. In addition to these spiral cords the cords themselves and the spaces that separate them are marked by strong spiral threads. This is also true of the sulcus at the summit, the base, and partly so of the columella. The axial sculpture consists of very heavy, broad, low, rounded ribs which are about twice as wide as the spaces that separate them. These ribs are rendered nodulose by the two strong spiral cords. They are also marked, as well as the intercostal spaces, by slender lines of growth that extend over the entire surface of the shell. Of these ribs, 12 are present on all the whorls. The suture is slightly constricted. The periphery is well rounded. The base of the shell is short, marked by three strong spiral cords. The columella is moderately long, slightly curved and marked by nine strong spiral cords, between and on which slender spiral threads are present. The aperture is moderately long, channeled posteriorly and anteriorly. Unfortunately, the outer lip is fractured in the unique type so that it is impossible accurately to describe this, and the shell is not sufficiently mature to have differentiated the heavy varix behind the aperture characteristic of the group. The inner lip constitutes the heavy callus that extends upon the parietal wall.

== Distribution ==
C. disticha can be found in Caribbean waters, ranging from the western coast of Florida to Puerto Rico.
