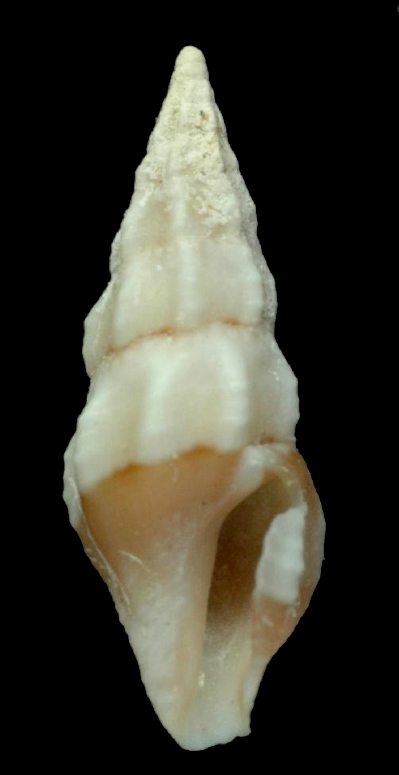
- Apertural view of a shell of Carinodrillia quadrilirata (Specimen in MNHN, Paris)

Scientific classification
- Kingdom: Animalia
- Phylum: Mollusca
- Class: Gastropoda
- Subclass: Caenogastropoda
- Order: Neogastropoda
- Superfamily: Conoidea
- Family: Pseudomelatomidae
- Genus: Carinodrillia
- Species: C. quadrilirata

Binomial name
- Carinodrillia quadrilirata (E.A. Smith, 1882)

Synonyms
- Crassispira quadrilirata (E. A. Smith, 1882); Pleurotoma (Clavus) quadrilirata E.A. Smith, 1882 (original combination); Turris quadrilirata (E. A. Smith, 1882)

= Carinodrillia quadrilirata =

Species of gastropod

Carinodrillia quadrilirata is a species of sea snail, a marine gastropod mollusk in the family Pseudomelatomidae, the turrids and allies.

== Description ==
The length of the shell varies between 10 mm and 25 mm.

The white, ovate-fusiform shell contains 9 whorls. The superior half of the whorls is concave, the lower half slightly convex. The deep pinkish-brown line above the suture is most apparent between the ribs. The four lirations on the ribs are rather acute and prominent, and are only on the lower half of the whorls. The dark white aperture is narrow and measures 3/8 of the total length. The columella is straight, callous and shows a tubercle at the suture. The siphonal canal is very short and slightly recurved.

== Distribution ==
This marine species occurs in the Indo-Pacific and off the Philippines and Taiwan.
