= Compsodrillia mammillata =

Scientific classification
- Kingdom: Animalia
- Phylum: Mollusca
- Class: Gastropoda
- Subclass: Caenogastropoda
- Order: Neogastropoda
- Superfamily: Conoidea
- Family: Pseudomelatomidae
- Genus: Compsodrillia
- Species: C. mammillata

Binomial name
- Compsodrillia mammillata Kuroda, Habe & Oyama, 1971

Synonyms
- Compsodrillia (Mammillaedrillia) mammillata Kuroda, Habe & Oyama, 1971

Species of gastropod

Compsodrillia mammillata is a species of sea snail, a marine gastropod mollusk in the family Pseudomelatomidae, the turrids and allies.

== Distribution ==
This marine species occurs off Japan.
