= Compsodrillia undatichorda =

Scientific classification
- Kingdom: Animalia
- Phylum: Mollusca
- Class: Gastropoda
- Subclass: Caenogastropoda
- Order: Neogastropoda
- Superfamily: Conoidea
- Family: Pseudomelatomidae
- Genus: Compsodrillia
- Species: C. undatichorda

Binomial name
- Compsodrillia undatichorda McLean & Poorman, 1971

Species of gastropod

Compsodrillia undatichorda is a species of sea snail, a marine gastropod mollusk in the family Pseudomelatomidae, the turrids and allies.

== Distribution ==
This marine species occurs off the Galapagos Islands.
