= Carinodrillia bilirata =

Scientific classification
- Kingdom: Animalia
- Phylum: Mollusca
- Class: Gastropoda
- Subclass: Caenogastropoda
- Order: Neogastropoda
- Superfamily: Conoidea
- Family: Pseudomelatomidae
- Genus: Carinodrillia
- Species: C. bilirata

Binomial name
- Carinodrillia bilirata (Smith, E.A., 1888)

Species of gastropod

Carinodrillia bilirata is a species of sea snail, a marine gastropod mollusk in the family Pseudomelatomidae.
