= Carinodrillia bella =

Scientific classification
- Kingdom: Animalia
- Phylum: Mollusca
- Class: Gastropoda
- Subclass: Caenogastropoda
- Order: Neogastropoda
- Superfamily: Conoidea
- Family: Pseudomelatomidae
- Genus: Carinodrillia
- Species: C. bella

Binomial name
- Carinodrillia bella (T.A. Conrad, 1862)

Synonyms
- Drillia bella T.A. Conrad, 1862

Extinct species of gastropod

Carinodrillia bella is an extinct species of sea snail, a marine gastropod mollusk in the family Pseudomelatomidae, the turrids and allies.

== Distribution ==
This extinct species occurs in Miocene strata of the Atlantic Ocean slope.
