= Sediliopsis ondulum =

Scientific classification
- Kingdom: Animalia
- Phylum: Mollusca
- Class: Gastropoda
- Subclass: Caenogastropoda
- Order: Neogastropoda
- Superfamily: Conoidea
- Family: Pseudomelatomidae
- Genus: Sediliopsis
- Species: S. ondulum

Binomial name
- Sediliopsis ondulum (Fargo, 1953)

Extinct species of gastropod

Sediliopsis ondulum is an extinct species of sea snail, a marine gastropod mollusk in the family Pseudomelatomidae, the turrids and allies.

== Distribution ==
Fossils of this species were found in Pliocene strata of Florida, USA.
