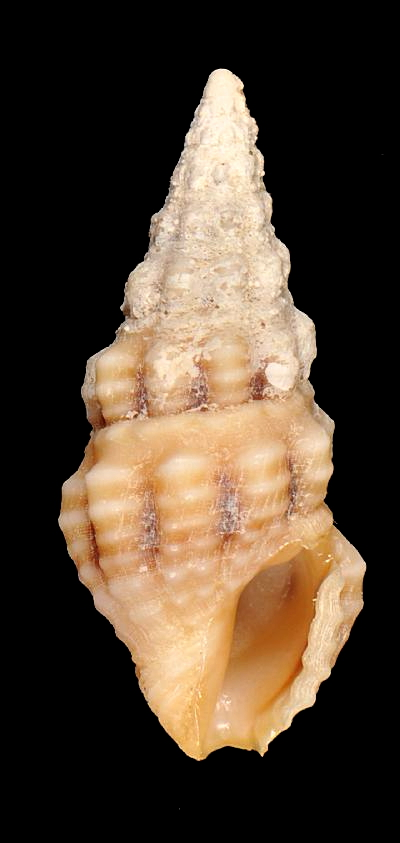
- Shell of Buchema interstrigata (specimen at MNHN, Paris)

Scientific classification
- Kingdom: Animalia
- Phylum: Mollusca
- Class: Gastropoda
- Subclass: Caenogastropoda
- Order: Neogastropoda
- Superfamily: Conoidea
- Family: Horaiclavidae
- Genus: Buchema
- Species: B. interstrigata

Binomial name
- Buchema interstrigata (E. A. Smith, 1882)

Synonyms
- Crassispira caribbaea (E.A. Smith, 1882); Drillia (Neodrillia) euphanes Melvill 1923; Pleurotoma (Crassispira) caribbaea Smith, E.A., 1882; Pleurotoma (Clavus) interstrigata E. A. Smith, 1882

= Buchema interstrigata =

Species of gastropod

Buchema interstrigata is a species of sea snail, a marine gastropod mollusk in the family Horaiclavidae.

== Description ==
The length of the acuminate pyramidal shell varies between 7 mm and 12 mm. The shell consists of 7½ whorls of which 1½ in the protoconch. Each of the longitudinal ribs may be said to be composed of four transverse nodules, and those on the body whorl are bifurcate from the middle downwards. The lirae on the body whorl below the four principal ones are only slightly interrupted in the interstices between the ribs. The aperture is whitish near the outer lip. The sinus is small. The siphonal canal is very short.

== Distribution ==
This marine species occurs from Panama to Eastern Brazil; also off the Virgin Islands; Saint Vincent, Martinique and Cuba.
