= Carinodrillia alboangulata =

Scientific classification
- Kingdom: Animalia
- Phylum: Mollusca
- Class: Gastropoda
- Subclass: Caenogastropoda
- Order: Neogastropoda
- Superfamily: Conoidea
- Family: Pseudomelatomidae
- Genus: Carinodrillia
- Species: C. alboangulata

Binomial name
- Carinodrillia alboangulata (E.A. Smith, 1882)

Synonyms
- Pleurotoma (Clavus) alboangulata E.A. Smith, 1882

Species of gastropod

Carinodrillia alboangulata is a species of sea snail, a marine gastropod mollusk in the family Pseudomelatomidae, the turrids.

== Description ==
The length of the shell attains 20 mm, its diameter 7 mm.

This ovate-fusiform species contains 9 whorls. It is very remarkably coloured. The seven white stripes radiating from the apex down the blunt, continuous ribs as far as the middle of the body whorl contrast very markedly with the deep-brown ground-colour of the shell. The aperture is rather small, measuring 2/5 of the total length of the shell. Its interior is reddish purple. The rather narrow siphonal canal is very short.

== Distribution ==
This species occurs in the Pacific Ocean off Panama.
