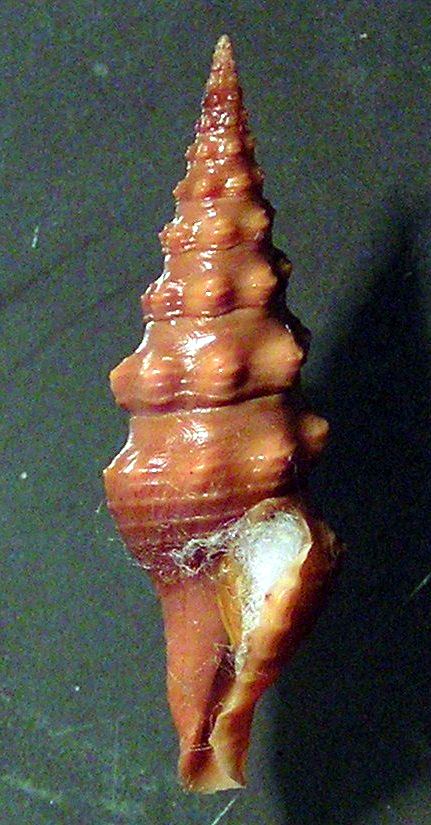
- Apertural view of a shell of Carinodrillia halis

Scientific classification
- Kingdom: Animalia
- Phylum: Mollusca
- Class: Gastropoda
- Subclass: Caenogastropoda
- Order: Neogastropoda
- Superfamily: Conoidea
- Family: Pseudomelatomidae
- Genus: Carinodrillia
- Species: C. halis

Binomial name
- Carinodrillia halis (Dall, 1919)

Synonyms
- Clathrodrillia (Carinodrillia) halis Dall, 1919

= Carinodrillia halis =

Species of gastropod

Carinodrillia halis is a species of sea snail, a marine gastropod mollusk in the family Pseudomelatomidae.

== Description ==
The length of the shell varies between 20 mm and 35 mm.

(Original description) The elongated, acute shell is yellowish white. It contains polished, more brownish whorls in the protoconch and nine subsequent whorls. The suture is appressed with an angular thread in front of it, separated by an excavated wide fasciole,. The shell is microscopically spirally striated, from an acute shoulder surmounted by a single cord. The other spiral sculpture consists of (on the body whorl nine) widely separated subequal cords on the posterior one of which the suture is laid. These have the interspaces minutely striated and are not swollen when they pass over the ribs. The axial sculpture consists of (on the body whorl six) short, very prominent ribs with narrower interspaces, not continuous up the spire and horizontally angulated by the cord which forms the periphery. They undulate the succeeding suture but are obsolete on the base and anal fasciole. On the early part of the spire the peripheral cord is duplex, but the posterior thread gradually fades out. The aperture is narrow. The anal sulcus is deep and rounded. The outer lip is thin, sharp and arcuately produced. The inner lip is erased. The columella is short. The siphonal canal is very short but distinct.

== Distribution ==
This marine species occurs from the Sea of Cortez to Panama. Fossils have been found in Quaternary strata of Costa Rica, age range: 2.588 to 0.781 Ma
