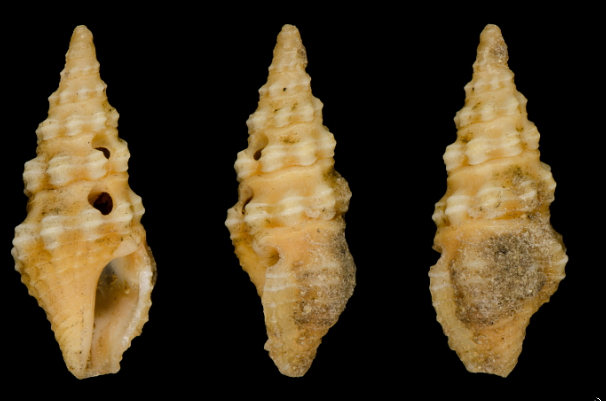
- Shell of Carinodrillia mamona (holotype at the Smithsonian Institution)

Scientific classification
- Kingdom: Animalia
- Phylum: Mollusca
- Class: Gastropoda
- Subclass: Caenogastropoda
- Order: Neogastropoda
- Superfamily: Conoidea
- Family: Pseudomelatomidae
- Genus: Carinodrillia
- Species: C. mamona

Binomial name
- Carinodrillia mamona Corea, 1934

= Carinodrillia mamona =

Species of gastropod

Carinodrillia mamona is a species of sea snail, a marine gastropod mollusk in the family Pseudomelatomidae, the turrids and allies.

== Description ==
The length of the shell is 11 mm, and its diameter is 4.3 mm.

== Distribution ==
This species occurs off Puerto Rico at depths between 60 m and 73 m.
