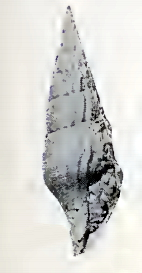
- Shell of † Carinodrillia bocatoroensis

Scientific classification
- Kingdom: Animalia
- Phylum: Mollusca
- Class: Gastropoda
- Subclass: Caenogastropoda
- Order: Neogastropoda
- Superfamily: Conoidea
- Family: Pseudomelatomidae
- Genus: Carinodrillia
- Species: C. bocatoroensis

Binomial name
- Carinodrillia bocatoroensis (A.A. Olsson, 1922)

Synonyms
- † Drillia bocatoroensis T.A. Conrad, 1862

= Carinodrillia bocatoroensis =

Extinct species of gastropod

Carinodrillia bocatoroensis is an extinct species of sea snail, a marine gastropod mollusk in the family Pseudomelatomidae, the turrids and allies.

== Description ==
The length of the shell attains 23 mm, its diameter 8 mm.

(Original description) The shell is of medium size. It is solid and strongly sculptured with ribs and spirals. It contains about 11 whorls, the protoconch is eroded in the type specimen. The fasciole occupies about 1/3 of the width of the spire whorl, with a large sutural cord above which the edge of the suture is finely and regularly beaded or granulated. The surface of the fasciole is slightly undulated by the obsolete ends of the ribs, otherwise smooth. The fasciole is nearly smooth, bordered above by a heavy sutural cord. The axial ribs number about 8 on the body whorl, straight and nearly in line across the face of the spire-whorls to the apex, but interrupted and lacking from each fasciole. The spiral sculpture consists of the few raised cords with wider interspaces. There are 3 spirals on the spire-whorls, about 6 on the body whorl, with 9 more on the anterior canal. The interspaces in addition carry fine and submicroscopic spiral lines. The base of the body whorl is somewhat constricted with a short siphonal canal.

== Distribution ==
This extinct species occurs in Pliocene strata of Jamaica; age range: 3.6 to 2.588 Ma; i n Middle and Upper Miocene strata of the Gatun Stage at Bocas del Toro, Costa Rica.
