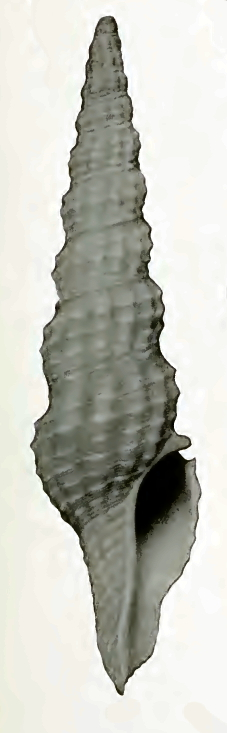
- Original image of a shell of Compsodrillia petersoni

Scientific classification
- Kingdom: Animalia
- Phylum: Mollusca
- Class: Gastropoda
- Subclass: Caenogastropoda
- Order: Neogastropoda
- Superfamily: Conoidea
- Family: Pseudomelatomidae
- Genus: Compsodrillia
- Species: C. petersoni

Binomial name
- Compsodrillia petersoni Bartsch, 1934

= Compsodrillia petersoni =

Species of gastropod

Compsodrillia petersoni is a species of sea snail, a marine gastropod mollusk in the family Pseudomelatomidae.

== Description ==
The length of the shell attains 28 mm, its diameter 6.7 mm.

(Original description) The very elongate-conic shell is bluish white. The protoconch contains 2.5 whorls, the first two well rounded, smooth, the last half crossed by a number of distantly spaced axial riblets. The postnuclear whorls are well rounded, the first with two nodulose spiral threads, the second with three, of which the median is the strongest. These remain throughout the length of the shell. In addition to this the appressed summit of the shell appears as a spiral cord. The posterior sinus is narrow and located immediately below the spiral cord at the summit. In addition to the strong spiral cords finer spiral threads are present both in the sinal sulcus near the summit and on and between the ribs anterior to this. In addition to the spiral sculpture the whorls are marked by axial ribs which have their beginning in the nodulose spiral threads on the first postnuclear whorl. These axial ribs are slightly protractively slanting. They extend but very slightly posteriorly to the posterior sulcus, and evanesce anteriorly on the base of the body whorl. They are more than twice the width of the spaces that separate them. Of these, 10 occur upon the first to seventh, 12 upon the eighth to tenth, and 14 upon the body whorl. These ribs and the spaces that separate them are marked by lines of growth, which also extend across the posterior sulcus and over the base and columella and give to the general surface a finely reticulated clothlike sculpture. The suture is slightly impressed. The base of the shell is well rounded, marked by four strong nodulose spiral cords like the spire and the intervening spiral threads. The columella is rather long, twisted, with an obscure indication of an umbilicus at its tip, marked by seven strong, broad, rounded, very nodulose spiral cords, and six slender threads on the anterior tip. Between and on the strong cords on the columella finer threads are present. The aperture is rather long, strongly channeled anteriorly and posteriorly, the posterior channel almost forming a tube, since the outer lip and the parietal callus bend forward, partly closing it. The outer lip bears a strong varix one fifth of a turn behind its edge, and beyond this is drawn into a clawlike element, which bends in very slightly toward the aperture. The inner lip is strongly developed and projects considerably beyond the columella and extends as a rather thickened callus over the parietal wall, forming a decided knob at the termination of the posterior angle of the aperture.

== Distribution ==
This species occurs in the Caribbean Sea off Puerto Rico.
