= Buchema nigra =

Scientific classification
- Kingdom: Animalia
- Phylum: Mollusca
- Class: Gastropoda
- Subclass: Caenogastropoda
- Order: Neogastropoda
- Superfamily: Conoidea
- Family: Horaiclavidae
- Genus: Buchema
- Species: B. nigra

Binomial name
- Buchema nigra Fallon, 2010

Species of gastropod

Buchema nigra is a species of sea snail, a marine gastropod mollusk in the family Horaiclavidae. The scientific name of the species was first published in 2010 by Fallon.

== Distribution ==
This marine species occurs in the tropical Northwest Atlantic Ocean.
