= Sediliopsis aphanitoma =

Scientific classification
- Kingdom: Animalia
- Phylum: Mollusca
- Class: Gastropoda
- Subclass: Caenogastropoda
- Order: Neogastropoda
- Superfamily: Conoidea
- Family: Pseudomelatomidae
- Genus: Sediliopsis
- Species: S. aphanitoma

Binomial name
- Sediliopsis aphanitoma (W.H. Dall, 1892)

Synonyms
- † Drillia aphanitoma W.H. Dall, 1892

Extinct species of gastropod

Sediliopsis aphanitoma is an extinct species of sea snail, a marine gastropod mollusk in the family Pseudomelatomidae, the turrids and allies.

== Description ==
The length of the shell attains 21.5 mm, its diameter 8 mm.

(Original description) The shell has a pointed, conical spire and large body whorl. The sculpture is obsolete on two smooth nuclear and eight later whorls. The protoconch is small and blunt. it is followed by a closely reticulated third whorl. The spiral sculpture is obscure. It consists of larger and smaller spirals, more or less alternated, but hardly interrupting the continuity of the surface, the most evident being a peripheral pair. The whorl is thickened in front of the appressed suture, and yet not distinctly to form a thread. The spirals are most distinct near the columella. The transverse sculpture consists of (about nine on the body whorl) well-marked, prominent ribs, extending on the early whorls from suture to suture, and rather wide incremental lines, sometimes pleated at the suture. The anal fasciole is not constricted, obscure, with a shallow notch. The columella is distinct, with a well-marked siphonal fasciole. Internally with a smooth enamel reflected over it. The aperture is narrow. The siphonal canal is recurved and deeply notched. The outer lip is thin, arched, simple, varicose behind, smooth within.

== Distribution ==
Fossils of this species were found in Pliocene Strata in Florida and North Carolina, USA.
