= Compsodrillia drewi =

Scientific classification
- Kingdom: Animalia
- Phylum: Mollusca
- Class: Gastropoda
- Subclass: Caenogastropoda
- Order: Neogastropoda
- Superfamily: Conoidea
- Family: Pseudomelatomidae
- Genus: Compsodrillia
- Species: C. drewi

Binomial name
- Compsodrillia drewi J.A. Gardner, 1948

Extinct species of gastropod

Compsodrillia drewi is an extinct species of sea snail, a marine gastropod mollusk in the family Pseudomelatomidae, the turrids and allies.

== Description ==
The shell is very small, with the length of the shell attaining 10 mm. The maximum diameter is around 4.3 mm.

== Distribution ==
Fossils have been found in Pliocene strata of North Carolina, USA.
