= Buchema tainoa =

Scientific classification
- Kingdom: Animalia
- Phylum: Mollusca
- Class: Gastropoda
- Subclass: Caenogastropoda
- Order: Neogastropoda
- Superfamily: Conoidea
- Family: Horaiclavidae
- Genus: Buchema
- Species: B. tainoa

Binomial name
- Buchema tainoa (Corea, 1934)

Synonyms
- Carinodrillia (Buchema) tainoa Corea, 1934 (original combination)

Species of gastropod

Buchema tainoa is a species of sea snail, a marine gastropod mollusk in the family Horaiclavidae.

It was formerly included within the family Turridae.

== Description ==
The length of the shell attains 14.2 mm, its diameter 5.9 mm.

== Distribution ==
This marine species occurs off Puerto Rico.
