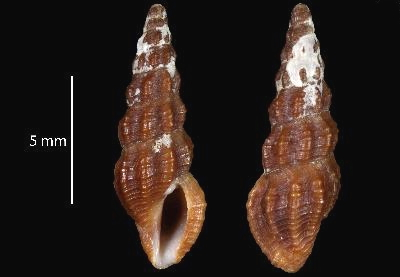
- Shell of Buchema shearmani

Scientific classification
- Kingdom: Animalia
- Phylum: Mollusca
- Class: Gastropoda
- Subclass: Caenogastropoda
- Order: Neogastropoda
- Superfamily: Conoidea
- Family: Horaiclavidae
- Genus: Buchema
- Species: B. shearmani

Binomial name
- Buchema shearmani Morassi & Bonfitto, 2013

= Buchema shearmani =

Species of gastropod

Buchema shearmani is a species of sea snail, a marine gastropod mollusk in the family Horaiclavidae.

== Description ==
Of the five Buchema species from Puerto Rico proposed by Corea (1934), Buchema shearmani resembles the type species Carinodrillia (Buchema) tainoa Corea (1934). Its shell colour varies from brownish orange with ivory white spiral cords to uniform dark brown. The length of the shell attains 10mm.

== Distribution ==
This marine species was found off Mogadiscio, Somalia after being trawled by local fishermen.
