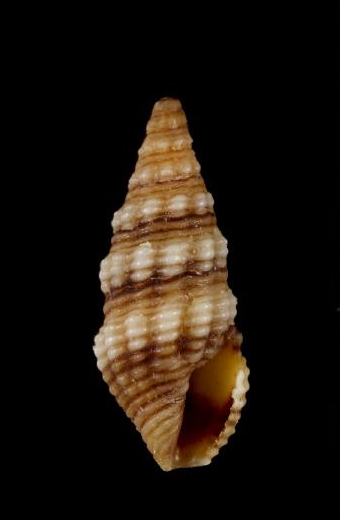
- Shell of Buchema primula (specimen at MNHN, Paris)

Scientific classification
- Kingdom: Animalia
- Phylum: Mollusca
- Class: Gastropoda
- Subclass: Caenogastropoda
- Order: Neogastropoda
- Superfamily: Conoidea
- Family: Horaiclavidae
- Genus: Buchema
- Species: B. primula

Binomial name
- Buchema primula (J.C. Melvill, 1923)

Synonyms
- Drillia primula Melvill, 1923 (original combination)

= Buchema primula =

Species of gastropod

Buchema primula is a species of sea snail, a marine gastropod mollusk in the family Horaiclavidae.

== Description ==
The length of the shell attains 6 mm. (Original description) The small, compact shell has a gradately fusiform shape. It contains 8 whorls, of which the uppermost two are nuclear, smooth, white, globular. The remainderare plicately ridged spirally at the sutures, and, below these, angularly sloping and closely longitudinally ribbed. The ribs are crossed, as regards the upper whorls, by two, the body whorl by four or five spiral incrassate revolving lines. These are gemmulate, white, and shining at the points of junction with the ribs. The interstices are oblong. The shell has a pale primrose hue, very delicate in colour. The aperture is small and oval. The outer lip is slightly angled centrally and thickened. The columellar margin is almost straight. The sinus is very obscure. The siphonal canal is abbreviate.

== Distribution ==
This marine species occurs in the Caribbean Sea off Cuba.
