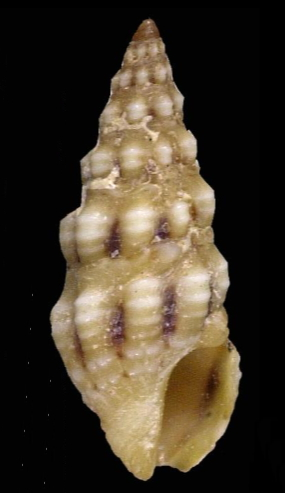
- Shell of Buchema interpleura (specimen at the Smithsonian Institution)

Scientific classification
- Kingdom: Animalia
- Phylum: Mollusca
- Class: Gastropoda
- Subclass: Caenogastropoda
- Order: Neogastropoda
- Superfamily: Conoidea
- Family: Horaiclavidae
- Genus: Buchema
- Species: B. interpleura

Binomial name
- Buchema interpleura (W. H. Dall & C. T. Simpson, 1901)

Synonyms
- Clathrodrillia interpleura (Dall & Simpson, 1901); Drillia interpleura Dall & Simpson, 1901 (original description)

= Buchema interpleura =

Species of gastropod

Buchema interpleura is a species of sea snail, a marine gastropod mollusk in the family Drilliidae.

== Description ==
The length of the shell varies between 11 and 12 mm (0.43 and 0.47 in).

== Distribution ==
This marine species occurs from Mexico to Northeast Brazil.
