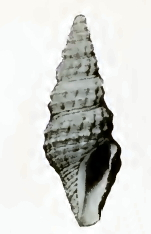

Scientific classification
- Kingdom: Animalia
- Phylum: Mollusca
- Class: Gastropoda
- Subclass: Caenogastropoda
- Order: Neogastropoda
- Superfamily: Conoidea
- Family: Pseudomelatomidae
- Genus: Compsodrillia
- Species: C. nana

Binomial name
- Compsodrillia nana Bartsch, 1934

= Compsodrillia nana =

Species of gastropod

Compsodrillia nana is a species of sea snail, a marine gastropod mollusk in the family Pseudomelatomidae.

== Description ==
The length of the shell attains 8.7 mm, its diameter 3.1 mm.

(Original description) The small, elongate-conic shell is yellowish white. The first one-half of the protoconch whorl is well rounded, smooth, the last half is marked by a few rather distantly spaced, slightly protractively slanting axial riblets. The postnuclear are whorls well rounded, the first marked by three slender spiral cords, of which the anterior two increase more rapidly in size than the first one, which remains rather feeble. The summit of the whorls is marked by a smooth spiral cord representing the portion appressed to the preceding turn. On the later whorls the sinal sulcus at the summit is crossed by two slender spiral threads anterior to the cord at the summit which divides the space between this cord and the first strong nodulose cord into nearly equal portions. There is also a slender spiral cord between the first and second strong nodulose cords on the antepenultimate turn and two on the body whorl. There are two slender spiral cords between the second nodulose cord and the nodulose cord at the periphery which shows weakly in the suture of the whorls. The axial sculpture consists of strong, broad, rounded, protractively slanting ribs, which are about twice as wide as the spaces that separate them. The junction of these ribs with the stronger spiral cords produces nodules. The suture is well impressed. The periphery is marked by a nodulose spiral cord, the major portion of which, however, falls immediately below the periphery. The base of the shell is short, well rounded, marked by two nodulose spiral cords. The columella is rather short and stumpy, marked by nine subequal, closely spaced, feebly nodulose spiral cords. The aperture is rather short, decidedly channeled anteriorly and posteriorly, the posterior channel falling in the posterior angle of the aperture. There is a strong varix a little behind the edge of the outer lip, and the outer lip between the channel at the summit and its base is protracted into a clawlike element, which, however, does not infringe upon the aperture. The inner lip is reflected as a distinct wall upon the columella and forms a heavy callus on the parietal wall.

== Distribution ==
This species occurs in the Caribbean Sea off Puerto Rico.
