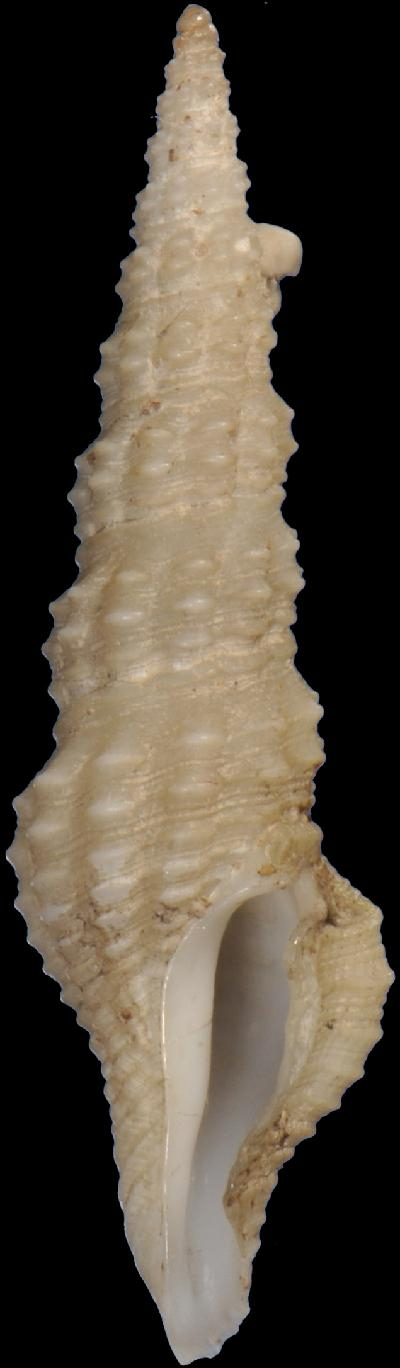
- Shell of Compsodrillia tristicha (specimen at MNHN, Paris)

Scientific classification
- Kingdom: Animalia
- Phylum: Mollusca
- Class: Gastropoda
- Subclass: Caenogastropoda
- Order: Neogastropoda
- Superfamily: Conoidea
- Family: Pseudomelatomidae
- Genus: Compsodrillia
- Species: C. tristicha

Binomial name
- Compsodrillia tristicha (Dall, 1889)

Synonyms
- Drillia tristicha Dall, 1889

= Compsodrillia tristicha =

Species of gastropod

Compsodrillia tristicha, common name the saddened turrid, is a species of sea snail, a marine gastropod mollusc in the family Pseudomelatomidae, the turrids and allies.

== Description ==
The length of the shell varies between 10 mm and 25 mm.

(Original description) The white shell is elongated, acute, with a rounded vitreous white two-whorled protoconch and nine succeeding whorls. The spiral sculpture consists of three principal strong threads, enlarged where they pass over the ribs, four more on the base of the body whorl, about eight somewhat weaker ones on the siphonal canal, and a single one in front of and marginating the suture. The interspaces are wide, and upon them and over the fasciole are wound numerous fine, sharp, undulating, secondary spiral threads. All these cross (on the penultimate whorl) fourteen even, rounded, narrow riblets, with narrower interspaces, which start at the anterior edge of the fasciole, cross the whorl, and fail on the siphonal canal. The suture is distinct and wavy. The fasciole is obscure, not excavated. The whorls are rounded. The varix is stout, thick, and rounded. The aperture is narrow. The notch is strongly marked and round. The outer lip is thin, without lirae. The inner lip shows a thin, smooth, elevated callus . The siphonal canal is distinct, rather long and narrow, not recurved. The columella is straight.

== Distribution ==
C. tristicha can be found in the Gulf of Mexico, ranging from the coast of Mississippi south to Brazil.
