= Compsodrillia nakamurai =

Scientific classification
- Kingdom: Animalia
- Phylum: Mollusca
- Class: Gastropoda
- Subclass: Caenogastropoda
- Order: Neogastropoda
- Superfamily: Conoidea
- Family: Pseudomelatomidae
- Genus: Compsodrillia
- Species: C. nakamurai

Binomial name
- Compsodrillia nakamurai Makiyama, 1931

Synonyms
- Compsodrillia (Mammillaedrillia) nakamurai Makiyama, 1931

Species of gastropod

Compsodrillia nakamurai is a species of sea snail, a marine gastropod mollusk in the family Pseudomelatomidae, the turrids and allies.

== Description ==
The length of the shell attains 14.7 mm.

== Distribution ==
This marine species occurs in the East China Sea and off Japan; fossils have been found in Miocene strata of Okinawa and Pliocene strata in Japan.

Compsodrillia was named by Woodring (1928) [Sepkoski's age data: T Mi R]. It is extant.

It was assigned to Turrinae by Woodring (1928); to Clavinae by MacNeil (1960); to Drillinae by Olsson (1964); to Neogastropoda by Sepkoski (2002); to Turridae by Gardner (1948), Todd (2001) and Scarponi and Della Bella (2003); and to Pseudomelaniidae by Bouchet et al. (2011).
