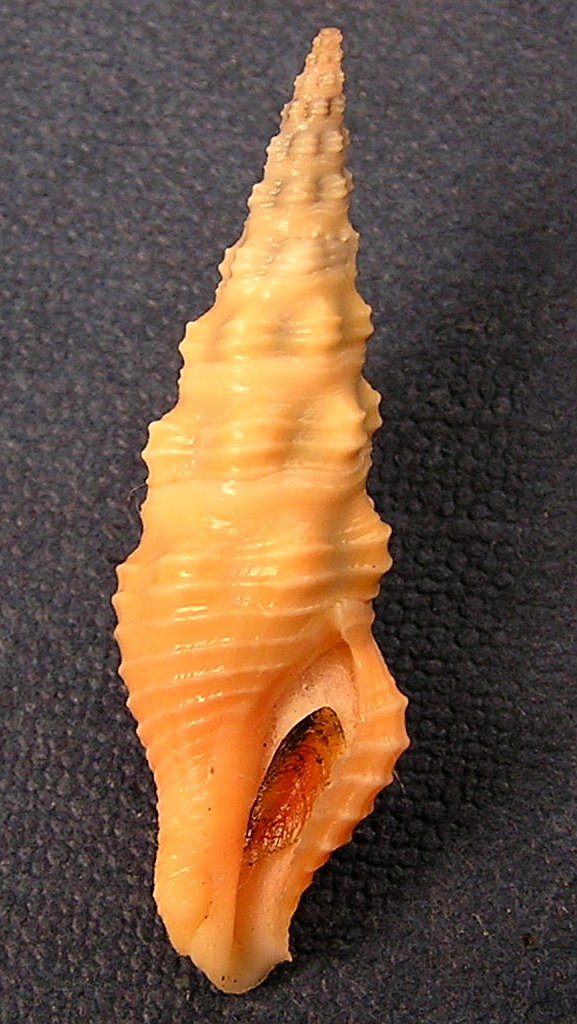
- Original image of a shell of Compsodrillia duplicata

Scientific classification
- Kingdom: Animalia
- Phylum: Mollusca
- Class: Gastropoda
- Subclass: Caenogastropoda
- Order: Neogastropoda
- Superfamily: Conoidea
- Family: Pseudomelatomidae
- Genus: Compsodrillia
- Species: C. duplicata

Binomial name
- Compsodrillia duplicata (Sowerby I, 1834)

Synonyms
- Pleurotoma duplicata Sowerby I, 1834

= Compsodrillia duplicata =

Species of gastropod

Compsodrillia duplicata is a species of sea snail, a marine gastropod mollusk in the family Pseudomelatomidae, the turrids and allies.

== Description ==
The length of the shell varies between 25 mm and 58 mm.

== Distribution ==
This species occurs in the Pacific Ocean between Mexico and Ecuador.
