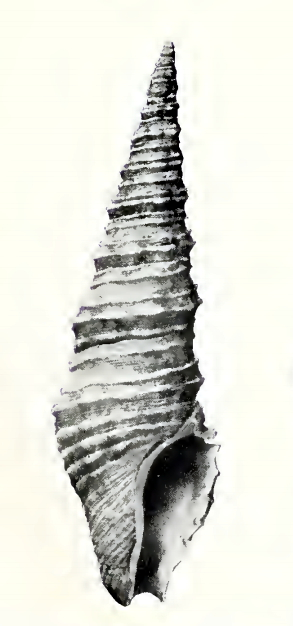
- Original image of a shell of Compsodrillia haliplexa

Scientific classification
- Kingdom: Animalia
- Phylum: Mollusca
- Class: Gastropoda
- Subclass: Caenogastropoda
- Order: Neogastropoda
- Superfamily: Conoidea
- Family: Pseudomelatomidae
- Genus: Compsodrillia
- Species: C. haliplexa

Binomial name
- Compsodrillia haliplexa (Dall, 1919)

Synonyms
- Clathrodrillia haliplexa Dall, 1919; Clathrodrillia (Carinodrillia) haliplexa Dall, 1919 (original combination)

= Compsodrillia haliplexa =

Species of gastropod

Compsodrillia haliplexa is a species of sea snail, a marine gastropod mollusk in the family Pseudomelatomidae, the turrids and allies.

== Description ==
The length of the shell attains 27 mm, its diameter 8 mm.

(Original description) The shell contains 12 whorls, excluding the (defective) protoconch. It is pale brown, acute, with an inconspicuous suture. It shows eight or nine prominent axial ribs with equal or wider interspaces and faint incremental lines. The anal fasciole is wide, constricted, a single strong cord and fine spiral threads between it and the suture. In front of the fasciole are about six strong cords slightly swollen as they override the ribs, with much wider interspaces occupied by fine spiral threads, the cord at the periphery stronger than the rest. The base shows threads of intermediate size, close-set. The outer lip is sharp, arcuate and undulate by the ends of the spiral cords. The anal sulcus is short, pear shaped with no subsutural callus. The body throat and the columella are white and smooth. The short siphonal canal is recurved.

== Distribution ==
This marine species occurs from the Gulf of California to Colombia
