= Carinodrillia suimaca =

Scientific classification
- Kingdom: Animalia
- Phylum: Mollusca
- Class: Gastropoda
- Subclass: Caenogastropoda
- Order: Neogastropoda
- Superfamily: Conoidea
- Family: Pseudomelatomidae
- Genus: Carinodrillia
- Species: C. suimaca

Binomial name
- Carinodrillia suimaca Corea, 1934

Species of gastropod

Carinodrillia suimaca is a species of sea snail, a marine gastropod mollusk in the family Pseudomelatomidae, the turrids and allies.

== Description ==
The length of the shell attains 13 mm.

== Distribution ==
This species occurs off Puerto Rico.
