= Carinodrillia adonis =

Scientific classification
- Kingdom: Animalia
- Phylum: Mollusca
- Class: Gastropoda
- Subclass: Caenogastropoda
- Order: Neogastropoda
- Superfamily: Conoidea
- Family: Pseudomelatomidae
- Genus: Carinodrillia
- Species: C. adonis

Binomial name
- Carinodrillia adonis Pilsbry & Lowe, 1932

Species of gastropod

Carinodrillia adonis is a species of sea snail, a marine gastropod mollusk in the family Pseudomelatomidae.

== Description ==
The shell is sharply conical and has 11 whorls, the first three of the whorls are smooth and pale. It is primarily cinnamon-brown in color, with lighter-colored tips. Each whorl has 6 thick ribs crossed by 4 spiral cords that wrap around the shell. The last whorl has about 18 additional spiral cords. Growth lines are visible across the shell. The siphonal canal is narrow, and a small thickened patch occurs near the shell opening. The shell reaches 17-25 mm in length and 5.6 mm in diameter.

== Distribution ==
This marine species occurs in the Pacific Ocean off Mexico, Panama, Peru and the Galapagos Islands.
