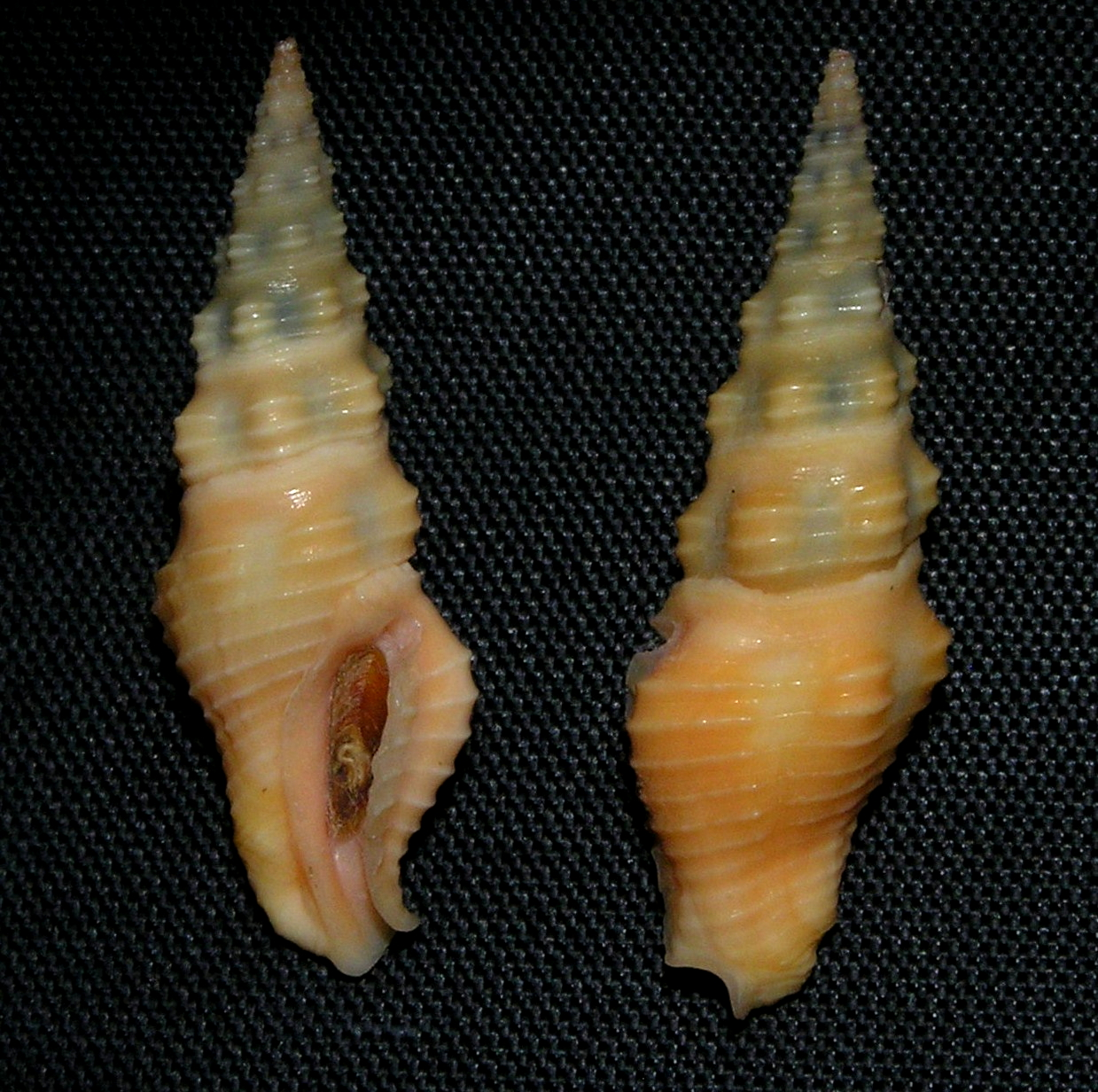
- Original image of a shell of Compsodrillia excentrica

Scientific classification
- Kingdom: Animalia
- Phylum: Mollusca
- Class: Gastropoda
- Subclass: Caenogastropoda
- Order: Neogastropoda
- Superfamily: Conoidea
- Family: Pseudomelatomidae
- Genus: Compsodrillia
- Species: C. excentrica

Binomial name
- Compsodrillia excentrica (Sowerby I, 1834)

Synonyms
- Pleurotoma excentrica Sowerby I, 1834

= Compsodrillia excentrica =

Species of gastropod

Compsodrillia excentrica is a species of sea snail, a marine gastropod mollusk in the family Pseudomelatomidae, the turrids and allies.

== Description ==
The length of the shell attains 28.3 mm.

== Distribution ==
This species occurs in the Pacific Ocean between Mexico and Panama; also off the Galapagos Islands (of doubtful occurrence)
