= Sediliopsis gracilis =

Scientific classification
- Kingdom: Animalia
- Phylum: Mollusca
- Class: Gastropoda
- Subclass: Caenogastropoda
- Order: Neogastropoda
- Superfamily: Conoidea
- Family: Pseudomelatomidae
- Genus: Sediliopsis
- Species: S. gracilis

Binomial name
- Sediliopsis gracilis (Conrad, 1830)

Synonyms
- † Pleurotoma gracilis Conrad, 1830

Extinct species of gastropod

Sediliopsis gracilis is an extinct species of sea snail, a marine gastropod mollusk in the family Pseudomelatomidae, the turrids and allies.

== Distribution ==
Fossils of this species were found in Miocene strata of Maryland, USA; age range: 11.608 to 5.332 Ma.
