= Carinodrillia pylonia =

Scientific classification
- Kingdom: Animalia
- Phylum: Mollusca
- Class: Gastropoda
- Subclass: Caenogastropoda
- Order: Neogastropoda
- Superfamily: Conoidea
- Family: Pseudomelatomidae
- Genus: Carinodrillia
- Species: C. pylonia

Binomial name
- Carinodrillia pylonia W.G. Fargo, 1953

Extinct species of gastropod

Carinodrillia pylonia is an extinct species of sea snail, a marine gastropod mollusk in the family Pseudomelatomidae, the turrids and allies.

== Distribution ==
This extinct species was found in Quaternary strata of Florida, United States and in Pliocene strata of Mexico; age range: 2.588 to 0.781 Ma
