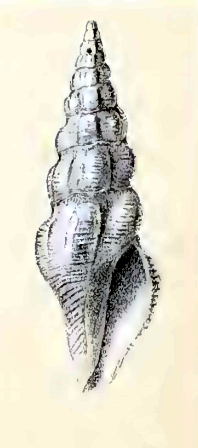
- Original image of a shell of Stenodrillia horrenda

Scientific classification
- Kingdom: Animalia
- Phylum: Mollusca
- Class: Gastropoda
- Subclass: Caenogastropoda
- Order: Neogastropoda
- Superfamily: Conoidea
- Family: Drilliidae
- Genus: Stenodrillia
- Species: S. horrenda

Binomial name
- Stenodrillia horrenda (Watson, 1886)

Synonyms
- Knefastia horrenda (Watson, 1886); Pleurotoma (Drillia) horrenda Watson, 1886 (original combination); Surcula horrenda (Watson, 1886)

= Stenodrillia horrenda =

Species of gastropod

Stenodrillia horrenda is a species of sea snail, a marine gastropod mollusk in the family Drilliidae.

== Description ==
The length of the shell attains 60 mm.

(Original description) The very coarse and strong, long, narrow shell has with a concave conical base. It shows huge hunchy ribs, and coarse spiral threads. Its longitudinal sculpture is characterized by six enormous bunchy oblique ribs on each whorl, which die out on the base and at the sinus below the suture, but reach the suture at the bottom of the upper whorls. They are parted by broad open furrows, which run obliquely to the left and more or less continuously down the spire. These ribs and furrows are roughened by coarse unequal lines of growth. The surface is scored by strong rough spiral threads parted by wider furrows. These threads are absent in the deep, strong, shallow, sinus-furrow below the suture, in which, however, a few feeble spiral threads are found. Two, a little stronger, marginate the underside of the suture. The shell of the holotype is weathered, but seems to have been of a uniform pale tint. The spire is very tall, narrow, and conical. The apex broken. There remain 11 convex whorls of slow increase. The last is hunchy but not large, and is drawn out into a concave base with a broad snout. The suture is small, very much distorted by the longitudinal ribs. The aperture is small, elongately and gibbously pear-shaped. The outer lip is immensely but remotely thickened outside by the last rib, from which it is bevelled off to a narrow edge. The U-shaped sinus is deep, broad, and strong, close up to the suture but parted from it by a big triangular shelf. Below it the lip edge advances very much and then retreats again in front. The inner lip shows a thin broad glaze on the columella, which is very strong, oblique to the left, slightly cut off in front, where alone it is twisted with a thin rounded edge

== Distribution ==
This species occurs off Florida, United States
