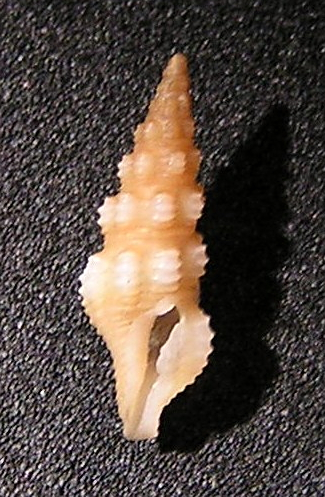
- Original image of a shell of Compsodrillia haliostrephis

Scientific classification
- Kingdom: Animalia
- Phylum: Mollusca
- Class: Gastropoda
- Subclass: Caenogastropoda
- Order: Neogastropoda
- Superfamily: Conoidea
- Family: Pseudomelatomidae
- Genus: Compsodrillia
- Species: C. haliostrephis

Binomial name
- Compsodrillia haliostrephis (Dall, 1889)

Synonyms
- Drillia eucosmia Dall, 1889; Stenodrillia eucosmia (W.H. Dall, 1889)

= Compsodrillia haliostrephis =

Species of gastropod

Compsodrillia haliostrephis, common name the spindle drillia, is a species of sea snail, a marine gastropod mollusc in the family Pseudomelatomidae, the turrids and allies.

== Description ==
The length of the shell varies between 10 mm and 25 mm.

(Original description) The pure white shell of the holotype contains 8 whorls with a glossy rounded vitreous protoconch of two whorls. The spiral sculpture resembles much as in Compsodrillia eucosmia, a line marginating the suture. There are two or three strong primaries on the upper whorls, five or six on the body whorl, and eight or ten smaller ones on the siphonal canal. The principal primaries are strongly marked and slightly swollen on the summits of the ribs. The secondary spirals, very faint or absent behind the periphery but present in the interspaces in front of it, are finer than in the C. eucosmia, and more numerous. The fasciole is wide, nearly smooth, undulated, and little excavated. The aperture is narrow and long. The notch of the aperture is shallow, the interior not lirate. The inner lip simple shows a thin callus. The siphonal canal is wide, straight and rather long;.The penultimate whorl, contains 7 ribs, narrower and less prominent, as is the varix, than in C. eucosmia

== Distribution ==
C. haliostrephis can be found in the Gulf of Mexico, ranging from the coast of Louisiana south to Brazil.
