= Buchema bellula =

Scientific classification
- Kingdom: Animalia
- Phylum: Mollusca
- Class: Gastropoda
- Subclass: Caenogastropoda
- Order: Neogastropoda
- Superfamily: Conoidea
- Family: Horaiclavidae
- Genus: Buchema
- Species: B. bellula

Binomial name
- Buchema bellula (E. A. Smith, 1882)

Synonyms
- Drillia (Clavus) bellula (E. A. Smith, 1882); Pleurotoma (Clavus) bellula E. A. Smith, 1882 (original combination)

Species of sea snail

Buchema bellula is a species of sea snail, a marine gastropod mollusk in the family of Horaiclavidae.

It was formerly included within the family Turridae.

== Description ==
The size of the fusiform shell varies between 6 mm and 8.5 mm, its diameter is 3.4 mm. The shell contains 8 whorls of which the first two in the protoconch. The aperture spans about a third of the whole length. The sinus is of mediocre size. The siphonal canal is very short and recurved to the left. The white band encircling the whorls includes three of the spiral lirations which are thickened upon the obsolete ribs. In fact, each rib might be said to be composed of the thickening of the lirae.

== Distribution ==
This marine species occurs in the Caribbean Sea off Guadeloupe, Saint Vincent and Aruba
