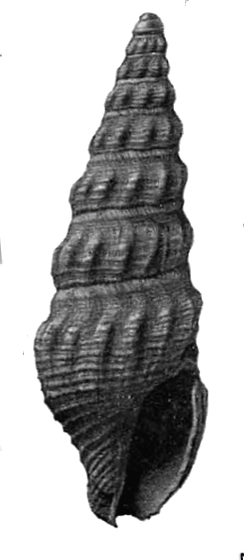
- Shell of † Sediliopsis chowanensis

Scientific classification
- Kingdom: Animalia
- Phylum: Mollusca
- Class: Gastropoda
- Subclass: Caenogastropoda
- Order: Neogastropoda
- Superfamily: Conoidea
- Family: Pseudomelatomidae
- Genus: Sediliopsis; Petuch, 1988

Type species
- Pleurotoma gracilis Conrad, 1830

Species
- See text

= Sediliopsis =

Genus of gastropods

Sediliopsis is a genus of sea snails, marine gastropod mollusks in the family Pseudomelatomidae.

This genus was long considered as extinct since the late Miocene, until Sedeliopsis riosi was discovered off Brazil, obviously a relict-pocket occurrence.

== Species ==
Species within the genus Sediliopsis include:

- † Sediliopsis angulata (Martin, 1904)
- † Sediliopsis aphanitoma (Dall, 1892)
- † Sediliopsis calvertensis (Martin, 1904)
- † Sediliopsis chowanensis (J. Garnder, 1948)
- † Sediliopsis distans (Conrad, 1862)
- † Sediliopsis gracilis (Conrad, 1830)
- † Sediliopsis incilifera (Conrad, 1834)
- † Sediliopsis ondulum (Fargo, 1953)
- † Sediliopsis patuxentia (Martin, 1904)
- Sediliopsis riosi Tippett, 1995
