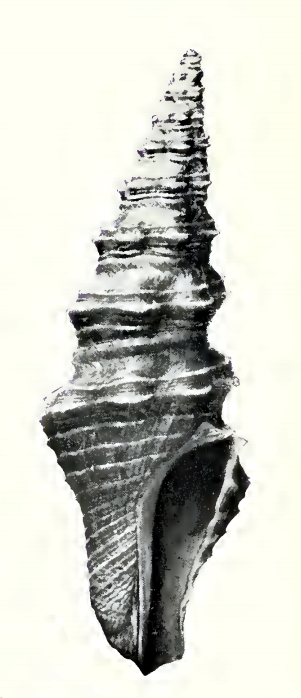
- Original image of a shell of Compsodrillia alcestis

Scientific classification
- Kingdom: Animalia
- Phylum: Mollusca
- Class: Gastropoda
- Subclass: Caenogastropoda
- Order: Neogastropoda
- Superfamily: Conoidea
- Family: Pseudomelatomidae
- Genus: Compsodrillia
- Species: C. alcestis

Binomial name
- Compsodrillia alcestis (Dall, 1919)

Synonyms
- Carinodrillia alcestris (Dall, 1919) misspelling - incorrect subsequent spelling; Carinodrillia dariena Olsson, 1971 junior subjective synonym; Clathrodrillia alcestis Dall, 1919; Clathrodrillia (Carinodrillia) alcestris Dall, 1919

= Compsodrillia alcestis =

Species of gastropod

Compsodrillia alcestis is a species of sea snail, a marine gastropod mollusk in the family Pseudomelatomidae, the turrids and allies.

== Description ==
The length of the shell attains 43.5 mm, its diameter 15.3 mm.

(Original description) The slender shell is acute and pale yellowish brown. It contains (the protoconch lost), about ten whorls. The suture is strongly appressed with a prominent cord (afterwards broadening into a band) in front of it. The siphonal fasciole is constricted; with only arcuate striation. The sculpture on the early whorls consists of two or three strong cords, swollen where they override the ribs, these are prominent on the periphery. On the later whorls the peripheral cord becomes an undulated keel and the interspaces are closely spirally striate. On the body whorl in front of the keel are about a dozen major threads with wide spirally striate interspaces. The axial sculpture of (on the body whorl seven) peripheral waves, rather than ribs, overridden by the spirals, the incremental lines inconspicuous. The aperture is narrow. The anal sulcus is slightly removed from the suture, distinct, with a small subsutural callus . The outer lip is moderately produced, sharp edged, slightly crenulate by the spiral sculpture, smooth within. The inner lip shows a moderate layer of callus, with slightly raised outer edge which is continued over the columella and on the siphonal canal is separated from the feeble siphonal fasciole by a narrow chin. The siphonal canal is short, wide and slightly recurved.

== Distribution ==
This marine species occurs from the Gulf of California to Colombia
