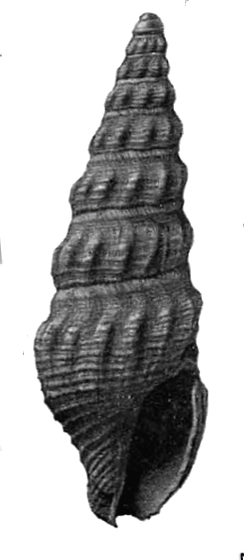
- Original image of a shell of Sediliopsis chowanensis

Scientific classification
- Kingdom: Animalia
- Phylum: Mollusca
- Class: Gastropoda
- Subclass: Caenogastropoda
- Order: Neogastropoda
- Superfamily: Conoidea
- Family: Pseudomelatomidae
- Genus: Sediliopsis
- Species: S. chowanensis

Binomial name
- Sediliopsis chowanensis (Gardner, 1848)

Synonyms
- † Compsodrillia chowanensis J. Gardner, 1948

= Sediliopsis chowanensis =

Extinct species of gastropod

Sediliopsis chowanensis is an extinct species of sea snail, a marine gastropod mollusk in the family Pseudomelatomidae, the turrids and allies.

== Description ==
The length of the shell attains 16.5 mm, its diameter 5.5 mm.

(Original description) A slender shell of medium size containing about nine whorls. The apex is decorticated, but apparently the smooth papillate initial whorl is succeeded by a little more than half a whorl, on which the sculpture is limited to a medial and a stronger anterior spiral. The remaining whorls are both axially and spirally adorned. The aial ribs number 13 on the later whorls. These are narrow, rounded, undulating the whorls from the anal fasciole to the anterior suture. but evanescent on the columella. The spiral sculpture is elaborate. The primaries are low, flat bands about 0.2 millimeter in breadth, somewhat irregularly spaced. There are 4 or 5 on the whorls of the spire, twice as many on the body whorl. The 10 lirations on the columella are narrower and more prominent. Between the primaries 1 or 2 secondaries are similar to the former in general character and separated from them and from each other by linear interspaces. They are lacking on the columella and near the apex. The anal fasciole is concave, sculptured with 5 to 7 crowded lirae, which become most prominent directly in front of the suture. The sinus is deep, rather narrow, and is set a little nearer to the periphery than to the posterior suture. The aperture is narrow, ovate and terminates in a short emarginate siphonal canal.

== Distribution ==
Fossils of this species were found in Pliocene strata of the Yorktown Formation, North Carolina, USA.
