= Carinodrillia elocata =

Scientific classification
- Kingdom: Animalia
- Phylum: Mollusca
- Class: Gastropoda
- Subclass: Caenogastropoda
- Order: Neogastropoda
- Superfamily: Conoidea
- Family: Pseudomelatomidae
- Genus: Carinodrillia
- Species: C. elocata

Binomial name
- Carinodrillia elocata (Pilsbry & Johnson, 1922)

Synonyms
- Drillia elocata Pilsbry & Johnson, 1922

Extinct species of gastropod

Carinodrillia elocata is an extinct species of sea snail, a marine gastropod mollusk in the family Pseudomelatomidae, the turrids and allies.

Subspecies : Carinodrillia elocata meta W.P. Woodring, 1928 from the Bowden Formation, Jamaica.

== Description ==
The length of the shell attains 27 mm.

== Distribution ==
This extinct species was found in Pliocene strata of Jamaica, in Miocene to Pliocene strata of the Dominican Republic and in Miocene strata of Panama; age range: 7.246 to 2.588 Ma.
