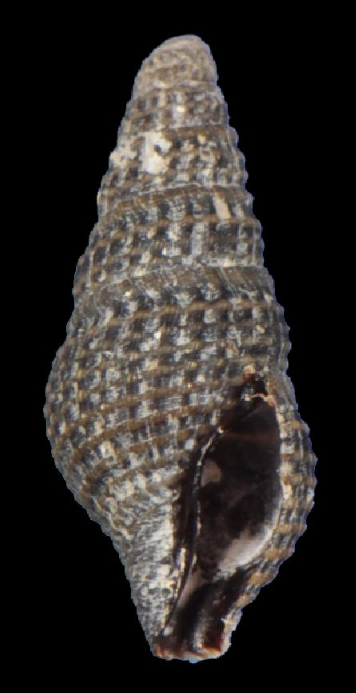
- Shell of Crassispira pellisphocae (specimen at MNHN, Paris)

Scientific classification
- Kingdom: Animalia
- Phylum: Mollusca
- Class: Gastropoda
- Subclass: Caenogastropoda
- Order: Neogastropoda
- Superfamily: Conoidea
- Family: Pseudomelatomidae
- Genus: Crassispira
- Species: C. pellisphocae

Binomial name
- Crassispira pellisphocae (Reeve, 1845)

Synonyms
- Carinodrillia limans Dall, 1919; Chauvetia pellisphocae Reeve, L.A., 1844; Clathrodrillia limans Dall, 1919; Crassispira cancellata Carpenter, 1864; Drillia cancellata Reeve, L.A., 1846; Pleurotoma cancellata Reeve, 1846; Pleurotoma pellisphocae Reeve, 1845 (original combination)

= Crassispira pellisphocae =

Species of gastropod

Crassispira pellisphocae is a species of sea snail, a marine gastropod mollusk in the family Pseudomelatomidae.

== Description ==
The length of the shell varies between 7 mm and 11 mm.

The small shell has a warm yellow brown color. It has a blunt short smooth protoconch of a 1½ whorl, followed by five or more subsequent moderately rounded whorls. The suture is distinct, appressed and moderately constricted with three or four fine spiral striae on the fasciole. The spiral sculpture consists of (on the penultimate whorl between the fasciole and the succeeding suture about six) fine equal, equally spaced threads, with narrower deep interspaces, forming minute nodules where they cross the ribs. On the body whorl the threading continues hardly altered, to the end of the siphonal canal. The axial sculpture consists of (on the penultimate whorl about 35) narrow ribs with subequal interspaces, extended from the fasciole to the siphonal canal, forming a very uniform reticulation over the whole surface. The aperture (the outer lip defective) is rather wide. The inner lip is erased. The whitish columella is short, stout,. The siphonal canal is very short and wide, hardly differentiated from the aperture.

== Distribution ==
This species occurs in the Sea of Cortez, Western Mexico; off the Virgin Islands; St Vincent; Aruba; off Western Africa and in the Alborán Sea, Western Mediterranean Sea.
