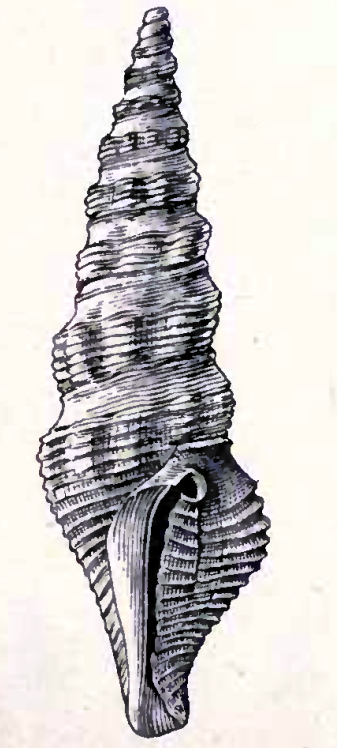
- Original image of a shell of Compsodrillia acestra

Scientific classification
- Kingdom: Animalia
- Phylum: Mollusca
- Class: Gastropoda
- Subclass: Caenogastropoda
- Order: Neogastropoda
- Superfamily: Conoidea
- Family: Pseudomelatomidae
- Genus: Compsodrillia
- Species: C. acestra

Binomial name
- Compsodrillia acestra (Dall, 1889)

Synonyms
- Drillia acestra Dall, 1889; Stenodrillia acestra W.H. Dall, 1889

= Compsodrillia acestra =

Species of gastropod

Compsodrillia acestra is a species of sea snail, a marine gastropod mollusc in the family Pseudomelatomidae, the turrids and allies.

== Description ==
The length of the shell attains 19 mm, its diameter 5.5 mm.

(Original description) The shell is long and slender. It has a pale olive-color, with a translucent white tip. It contains 9 whorls, with a smooth vitreous rounded two-whorled protoconch. The fasciole is wide, steep, excavated and marked with close-set fine even spirals.;It is bounded behind by a sharply cut elevated thread, a little space in front of the suture. The whorl in front of the fascicle is covered with close-set, strong, sub-equal, flattish spirals, with narrow channeled inter-spaces. These spirals, from two on the four apical whorls, increase to seven on the penultimate whorl, and eleven (behind those on the siphonal canal) on the body whorl. Here they are a little more widely separated, and have one or two intercalary fine threads in the inter-spaces. On the siphonal canal there are six primary threads alternating with somewhat smaller secondary ones. The transverse sculpture consists of gently elevated ribs (eight on the penultimate whorl), which vary in different specimens as to elevation and strength. In the type specimen figured they begin at the fascicle and fade on the base. The varix is strong and protrudes. There is a touch of livid color in front of it, which is seen nowhere else on the shell. The aperture is whitish. The throat is slightly livid, not lirate. The notch is deep and strong. The outer lip is thin, contracted for the siphonal canal. The inner lip shows a thin elevated callus. The columella is straight. The siphonal canal is rather short, and re-curved.

== Distribution ==
C. acestra can be found off the Florida Keys, in the Gulf of Mexico, off the coast of Eastern Brazil.
