= Compsodrillia jaculum =

Scientific classification
- Kingdom: Animalia
- Phylum: Mollusca
- Class: Gastropoda
- Subclass: Caenogastropoda
- Order: Neogastropoda
- Superfamily: Conoidea
- Family: Pseudomelatomidae
- Genus: Compsodrillia
- Species: C. jaculum

Binomial name
- Compsodrillia jaculum (Pilsbry & Lowe, 1932)

Synonyms
- Carinodrillia jaculum Pilsbry & Lowe, 1932

Species of gastropod

Compsodrillia jaculum, common name the javelin turrid, is a species of sea snail, a marine gastropod mollusk in the family Pseudomelatomidae, the turrids and allies.

== Description ==
The length of the shell varies between 15 mm and 20 mm.

== Distribution ==
This species occurs in the Pacific Ocean between Costa Rica and Ecuador.
