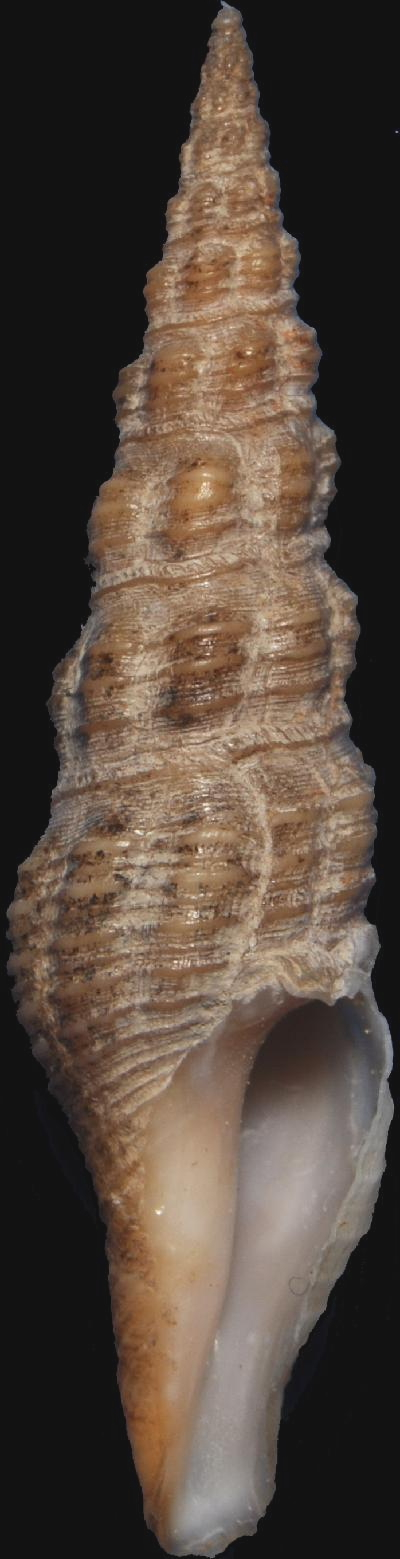
- Shell of Compsodrillia gundlachi (Specimen at MNHN, Paris)

Scientific classification
- Kingdom: Animalia
- Phylum: Mollusca
- Class: Gastropoda
- Subclass: Caenogastropoda
- Order: Neogastropoda
- Superfamily: Conoidea
- Family: Pseudomelatomidae
- Genus: Compsodrillia
- Species: C. gundlachi

Binomial name
- Compsodrillia gundlachi (W. H. Dall & C. T. Simpson, 1901)

Synonyms
- Drillia gundlachi Dall & Simpson, 1901; Stenodrillia gundlachi (W.H. Dall & C.T. Simpson, 1901)

= Compsodrillia gundlachi =

Species of gastropod

Compsodrillia gundlachi is a species of sea snail, a marine gastropod mollusk in the family Pseudomelatomidae, the turrids and allies. The specific epithet is named after Cuban naturalist Juan Gundlach.

== Description ==
The length of the shell attains 50 mm.

The original description is as follows: "The solid, slender shell is pale brown or whitish. It contains ten whorls (the nepionic whorls lost) strongly appressed at the suture; anal fascicle close to the suture,. The whorls are smooth or faintly spirally striated, rather wide and excavated. The notch is wide, not very deep. The sculpture consists of about six strong, short, turgid ribs obsolete in front of the periphery and on the last half of the body whorl. These are crossed by from two to five spiral threads stronger on the summits of the ribs, especially the pair which first appear, and faint, finer, spiral striations between the ribs. The lines of growth are well marked. The aperture is elongate. The outer lip is moderately thickened. The inner lip and aperture are white. The siphonal canal is rather wide."

== Distribution ==
This marine species occurs in the West Indies.
