= Carinodrillia fusiformis =

Scientific classification
- Kingdom: Animalia
- Phylum: Mollusca
- Class: Gastropoda
- Subclass: Caenogastropoda
- Order: Neogastropoda
- Superfamily: Conoidea
- Family: Pseudomelatomidae
- Genus: Carinodrillia
- Species: C. fusiformis

Binomial name
- Carinodrillia fusiformis (W.M. Gabb, 1873)

Synonyms
- Defrancia fusiformis (W.M. Gabb, 1873); Drillia fusiformis W.M. Gabb, 1873 (original combination)

Extinct species of gastropod

Carinodrillia fusiformis is an extinct species of sea snail, a marine gastropod mollusk in the family Pseudomelatomidae, the turrids and allies.

== Distribution ==
This extinct species was found in Miocene to Pliocene strata of the Dominican Republic and in Oligocene to Miocene strata of Haiti; age range: 33.9 to 3.6 Ma
