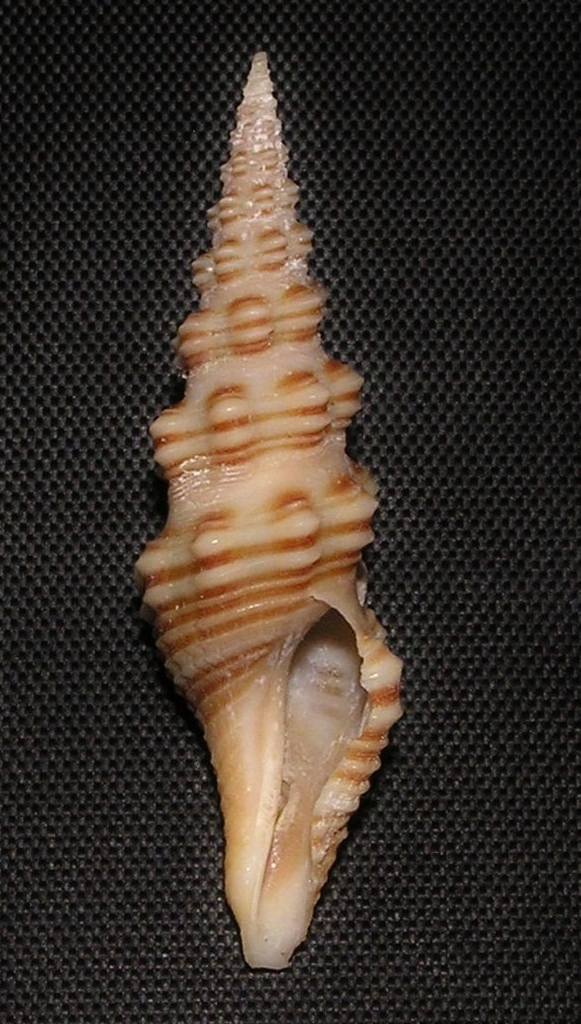
- Apertural view of a shell of Compsodrillia bicarinata

Scientific classification
- Kingdom: Animalia
- Phylum: Mollusca
- Class: Gastropoda
- Subclass: Caenogastropoda
- Order: Neogastropoda
- Superfamily: Conoidea
- Family: Pseudomelatomidae
- Genus: Compsodrillia
- Species: C. bicarinata

Binomial name
- Compsodrillia bicarinata (Shasky, 1961)

Synonyms
- Clathrodrillia bicarinata Shasky, 1961; Clathrodrillia (Carinodrillia) bicarinata Shasky, 1961; Carinodrillia bicarinata (Shasky, 1961

= Compsodrillia bicarinata =

Species of gastropod

Compsodrillia bicarinata is a species of sea snail, a marine gastropod mollusk in the family Pseudomelatomidae, the turrids and allies.

== Description ==
The length of the shell attains 52.2 mm, its diameter is 15.7 mm.

== Distribution ==
This marine species occurs in the Gulf of California.
