= Lois C. Rehder =

American malacologist

Lois Corea Rehder (1911; New York City, New York)–February 15, 1988; Bethesda, Maryland) was an American malacologist. Her husband, Harald Alfred Rehder (1907–1996), was also a malacologist.

She named the genus Buchema and several species in Carinodrillia under her maiden name Lois F. Corea.

Rehder moved from New York City to Washington, D.C. as an infant and attended Western High School and George Washington University.

== Works ==
- Corea, Lois Fleming. "New marine mollusks (with three plates)." (1934).

== See also ==
- List of malacologists
