= Harald A. Rehder =

American malacologist

Harald Alfred Rehder (June 5, 1907 – November 10, 1996) was an American malacologist. His wife, Lois Corea Rehder (1911–1988), was also a malacologist.

He (and/or his wife) named 172 marine taxa according to the World Register of Marine Species

He graduated from Bowdoin College (BA), Harvard University (MA), George Washington University (PhD).

He was a leading authority on the systematics and biogeography of the molluscan fauna of Polynesia. He introduced 238 new taxa on Mollusca.

== Works ==
- Rehder H. A. (July) 1952. Harold John Finlay, 1901-1951. The Nautilus 66(1): 30-31.
- Florence A. Ruhoff (1973), Bibliography and Zoological Taxa of Paul Bartsch, Biographical Sketch by Harald A. Rehder, Smithsonian Contributions to Zoology, Number 143
- M. J. Sweeney & M. J. Harasewych, 1999. Harald A. Rehder (1907-1996): biographical sketch and malacological contributions. The Nautilus 113(4): 127-150, portraits

== See also ==
- List of malacologists
