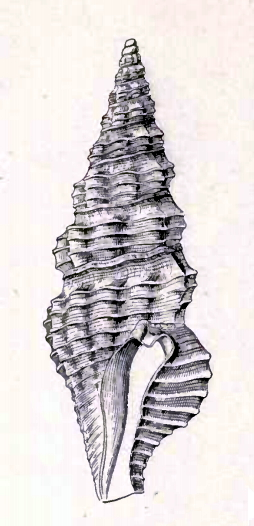
- Original image of a shell of Compsodrillia eucosmia
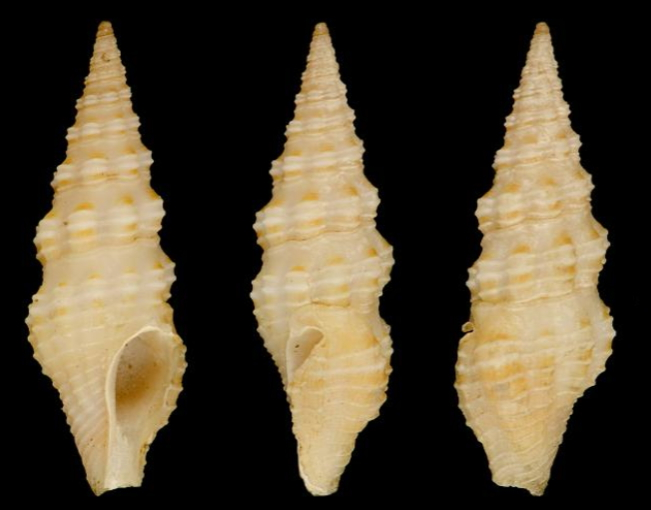
- holotype of Drillia eucosmia at the Smithsonian Institution

Scientific classification
- Kingdom: Animalia
- Phylum: Mollusca
- Class: Gastropoda
- Subclass: Caenogastropoda
- Order: Neogastropoda
- Superfamily: Conoidea
- Family: Pseudomelatomidae
- Genus: Compsodrillia
- Species: C. eucosmia

Binomial name
- Compsodrillia eucosmia (Dall, 1889)

Synonyms
- Drillia eucosmia Dall, 1889; Stenodrillia eucosmia W.H. Dall, 1889

= Compsodrillia eucosmia =

Species of gastropod

Compsodrillia eucosmia is a species of sea snail, a marine gastropod mollusc in the family Pseudomelatomidae, the turrids and allies.

== Description ==
The length of the shell varies between 10 mm and 25 mm.

(Original description) The color of the shell is pale, with touches of pale brown and a peripheral whitish zone. It contains 8 whorls, with a glossy, rounded protoconch of two whorls. The fasciole is rather wide, excavated, undulating in harmony with the ribs, marked by fine revolving threads and marginated at the appressed suture by a stout elevated line. The spiral sculpture on the rest of the shell (1) consists of (on the whorls preceding the body whorl) two or three prominent white stout threads, somewhat swollen where they ride over the ribs. On the body whorl there are about fifteen of these primary spirals. Between the fasciole and the end of the siphonal canal, in each of the wide interspaces, are (2) three or four much finer hardly elevated flattish threads, similar to those on the fasciole, and on the body whorl the marginating thread behind the fasciole is wider and somewhat crenulated. The transverse sculpture consists of (on the penultimate whorl 9) stout, rounded ribs, beginning at the fasciole and obsolete on the siphonal canal. Beside these there are only incremental lines. The brown touches are on these ribs above and below the white zone, which is bounded by the peripheral pair of primary spirals. The final varix is stout and rounded. The aperture is narrow. The notch is rounded and strongly marked. The outer lip is thin, arched forward and not lirate within. A single internal thread runs parallel with the fasciole deeper in the throat. The inner lip shows a thin callus with an elevated margin. The columella is straight. The siphonal canal is short, obliquely truncate and rather wide.

== Distribution ==
C. eucosmia can be found in the Gulf of Mexico, off the coast of Suriname; also off Grenada.
