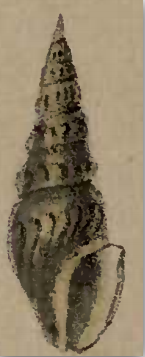
- Apertural view of a shell of Elaeocyma splendidula

Scientific classification
- Kingdom: Animalia
- Phylum: Mollusca
- Class: Gastropoda
- Subclass: Caenogastropoda
- Order: Neogastropoda
- Superfamily: Conoidea
- Family: Drilliidae
- Genus: Elaeocyma; Dall, 1918

Type species
- Drillia empyrosia Dall, 1899

= Elaeocyma =

Genus of gastropods

Elaeocyma is a genus of sea snails in the family Drilliidae.

== Description ==
This genus contains the light-colored species, with an oily gloss, thin shells, and prominent riblets usually crossed by rather widely spaced spiral striations, previously included in the genus Drillia.

== Distribution ==
This marine genus occurs off the Pacific coast of America.

== Species ==
Species within the genus Elaeocyma include:

- Elaeocyma amplinucis McLean & Poorman, 1971
- Elaeocyma arenensis (Hertlein & Strong, 1951)
- Elaeocyma attalia Dall, 1919
- † Elaeocyma benten (Yokoyama, 1920)
- † Elaeocyma citharella (Lamarck, 1803)
- † Elaeocyma drilliaeformis (Cossmann & Pissarro, 1901)
- Elaeocyma empyrosia (Dall, 1899)
- Elaeocyma melichroa McLean & Poorman, 1971
- † Elaeocyma plicata Lamarck 1804
- Elaeocyma ricaudae Berry, 1969
- Elaeocyma splendidula (Sowerby I, 1834)
- † Elaeocyma subcostaria (de Boury, 1899)
- Elaeocyma tjibaliungensis Y. Otuka, 1937
  - Elaeocyma tjibaliungensis turuhikoi Y. Otuka, 1937 (synonym: Clavus (Elaeocyma) tjibaliungensis turuhikoi Otuka, 1937)

Species brought into synonymy

- Elaeocyma abdera Dall, 1919 : synonym of Crassispira abdera (Dall, 1919)
- Elaeocyma acapulcana Lowe, 1935 : synonym of Drillia acapulcana (Lowe, 1935)
- Elaeocyma aegina Dall, 1919 : synonym of Calliclava aegina (Dall, 1919)
- Elaeocyma aerope Dall, 1919 : synonym of Drillia aerope (Dall, 1919)
- Elaeocyma arbela Dall, 1919 : synonym of Cymatosyrinx arbela (Dall, 1919)
- Elaeocyma baileyi Berry, 1969: synonym of Splendrillia lalage (Dall, 1919)
- † Elaeocyma chinensis MacNeil, 1960 : synonym of Siphonofusus chinensis (MacNeil, 1960)
- Elaeocyma craneana Hertlein & Strong, 1951 : synonym of Calliclava craneana (Hertlein & Strong, 1951)
- Elaeocyma halocydne Dall, 1919 : synonym of Kylix halocydne (Dall, 1919)
- Elaeocyma ianthe Dall, 1919 : synonym of Kylix ianthe (Dall, 1919)
- Elaeocyma impressa Hinds, 1843: synonym of Kylix impressa (R.B. Hinds, 1843)
- Elaeocyma salvadorica Hertlein & Strong, 1951: synonym of Clathrodrillia salvadorica (Hertlein & Strong, 1951)

The Indo-Pacific Molluscan Database (OBIS) also accepts the following subspecies:

- Elaeocyma glabriuscula glabriuscula (Yokoyama, 1922)
- Elaeocyma glabriuscula brevis (Yokoyama, 1922)

The following species are also included in this genus by the Shell Catalogue:

- Elaeocyma clavata (Sowerby, G.B. I, 1834)
