= Drillia rimata =

Scientific classification
- Kingdom: Animalia
- Phylum: Mollusca
- Class: Gastropoda
- Subclass: Caenogastropoda
- Order: Neogastropoda
- Superfamily: Conoidea
- Family: Drilliidae
- Genus: Drillia
- Species: D. rimata

Binomial name
- Drillia rimata (E.A. Smith, 1888)

Synonyms
- Pleurotoma (Drillia) rimata E.A. Smith, 1888

Species of sea snail

Drillia rimata is a species of small predatory sea snail, a marine gastropod mollusk in the family Drilliidae. It is distinguished by the distinct aperture and the livid "purplish flesh-color" of the shell.

It was first documented in 1888 by E. A. Smith as Pleurotoma (Drillia) rimata, however the status of this synonym is classified as uncertain due to taxon inquirendum. It is accepted as Drillia rimata, with the genus name (Drillia) from J. E. Gray's 1838 publication.

== Distribution ==
Species of Drilliidae are found all over the world, from intertidal to abyssal depths. However, very little is known about the distribution and habitat of D. rimata. No type locality or habitat is described in E. A. Smith's original publication.

== Description ==
The shell grows to a length of 31 mm; its diameter 9 mm.

The distinct aperture and the "livid purplish flesh-color" are the main identifying characters of D. rimata, according to E. A. Smith's original description.

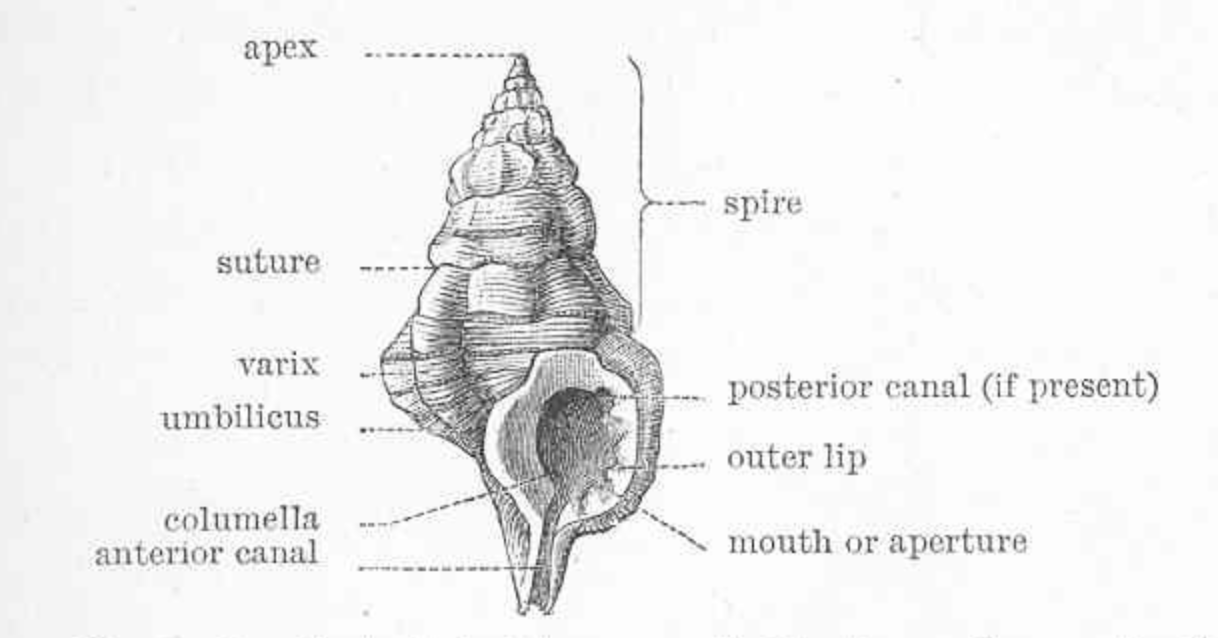
A diagram of a mollusk shell outlining some of the technical terms

The shell is elongated, thick, somewhat turreted, and distinctly grooved. The shell is slightly concave on top with slanting ribs; sutures barely making contact in the middle of the shell. The aperture is "purplish flesh-color" and is equal to two fifths of the shell's length; the side opening is near the suture. The columella (inner lip) very oblique and thick; the anterior canal is very short and curved.

The radula of the D. rimata, just like other Drilliidae species, consists five teeth in each row with a vestigial ("wisdom") tooth, comb-like lateral teeth and a pair of flat-pointed, slender, marginal teeth.

== See also ==
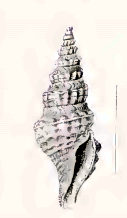
Sketching of Drillia sesquitertia, member of the Drillia genus, of which D. rimata is a part of

- Drillia
- Drilliidae
- Drillia acapulcana
- Drillia concolor
- Drillia havanensis
- Drillia omanensis
- Drillia sesquitertia
- Drillia spirostachys
- Drillia worthingtoni
