= Agladrillia leptalea =

Scientific classification
- Kingdom: Animalia
- Phylum: Mollusca
- Class: Gastropoda
- Subclass: Caenogastropoda
- Order: Neogastropoda
- Superfamily: Conoidea
- Family: Drilliidae
- Genus: Agladrillia
- Species: †A. leptalea

Binomial name
- †Agladrillia leptalea Woodring, 1928

Synonyms
- †Agladrillia (Agladrillia) leptalea, W. P. Woodring 1928

Extinct species of gastropod

Agladrillia leptalea is an extinct species of sea snail, a marine gastropod mollusk in the family Drilliidae.

It is the type species of the genus Agladrillia.

== Description ==
The height of the shell attains 16 mm, its diameter 5.4 mm.

(Original description) The shell is small and slender, with a protoconch consisting of about two and a half whorls. The stromboid notch is rather deep, as indicated by the growth lines, while the siphonal notch is moderately deep and asymmetrical. The sculpture features narrow axial ribs that are weakly overridden by very fine, widely spaced spiral threads. The anal fasciole is flat, adorned with curved, attenuated prolongations of the ribs and finer, more closely spaced spiral threads than those found on the rest of the whorl.

== Distribution ==
This extinct marine species was found in Pliocene strata on Jamaica.
