= Ianthe =

Ianthe (Ἰάνθη; English translation: "purple or azul flower") may refer to:

== Greek mythology ==
- Ianthe, Cretan girl who married Iphis after Isis turned Iphis from a woman into a man
- Ianthe (mythology), one of the 3,000 Oceanids

== People ==
- Ianthe Elizabeth Brautigan (born 1960), American writer, daughter of Richard Brautigan
- Ianthe Jeanne Dugan, investigative reporter for the Wall Street Journal
- Ianthe Jerrold (1898–1977), British novelist
- Ianthe Thomas (1951–2002), American children's author
- Ianthe, Lord Byron's nickname for Lady Charlotte Harley, to whom Childe Harold's Pilgrimage is dedicated
- Ianthe, Walter Savage Landor's nickname for his unrequited love Sophia Jane Swift
- Ianthe, nickname of actress Mary Saunderson
- Ianthe, a pen name of Emma Catherine Embury

== Fictional characters ==
- Ianthe, in Queen Mab (poem), an 1813 poem by Percy Bysshe Shelley
- Ianthe, a spirit in "Al Aaraaf," an 1829 poem by Edgar Allan Poe
- Ianthe, love interest of the main character in John William Polidori's The Vampyre
- Ianthe, in Roelstra's Line in the Dragon Prince series
- Ianthe, in An Unsuitable Attachment, a posthumous work by Barbara Pym
- Ianthe, in Sylvester, or the Wicked Uncle, a 1957 book by Georgette Heyer
- Ianthe, in A Court Of Mist And Fury, a 2016 book by Sarah J. Maas
- Ianthe, in House of Names, a 2017 book by Colm Tóibín
- Ianthe, in The Locked Tomb series by Tamsyn Muir

== Biology ==
- Ianthe, a genus of isopods formerly known as Tole
- Kylix ianthe, a sea snail in the family Drilliidae
- Pieris ianthe - see Belenois hedyle
- Dichomeris ianthes - see Dichomeris acuminata
- Pseudoneptis bugandensis ianthe - see Pseudoneptis

== Other uses ==
- Lake Ianthe, a lake on the West Coast of New Zealand 's South Island
- 98 Ianthe, a main belt asteroid
- Ianthe, a fabric and leatherwork pattern owned by Liberty of London Co.
