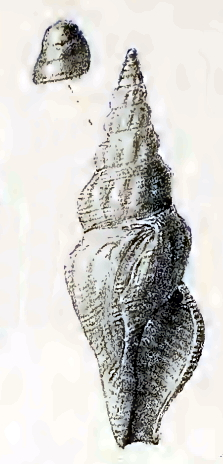
- Original image of the shell and protoconch of Drillia macilenta

Scientific classification
- Kingdom: Animalia
- Phylum: Mollusca
- Class: Gastropoda
- Subclass: Caenogastropoda
- Order: Neogastropoda
- Superfamily: Conoidea
- Family: Drilliidae
- Genus: Drillia
- Species: D. macilenta

Binomial name
- Drillia macilenta (Melvill, J.C., 1923)

Synonyms
- Clionella platysoma (E. A. Smith, 1877); Surcula macella Melvill, J.C., 1923 (renamed); Surcula macilenta Melvill, 1923

= Drillia macilenta =

Species of gastropod

Drillia macilenta is a species of sea snail, a marine gastropod mollusk in the family Drilliidae.

The type described by Barnard (1969) is smaller than Turris (Surcula) macella (Melvill, 1923). Kilburn (1988) supposed that this species was an undescribed Inquisitor or Agladrillia. It is described in WoRMS as Agladrillia macella (Melvill, 1923) (original combination: Turris macella Melvill, 1923).

J.C. Melvill renamed in 1923 Surcula macilenta, as the preoccupied name had already been given to a Tertiary fossil species Murex macilenta as long ago as 1766 by Dr. Solander; later, in 1799, named by F. E. Edwards as Pleurotoma macilenta. For these reasons, Melvill renamed the species as Surcula macella.

== Description ==
The length of the shell attains 17 mm, its diameter 5 mm.

The thin fusiform shell is gracefully attenuate. It is pale tan-coloured. It contains 9 - 10 whorls, of which the two whorls in the protoconch are pale, shining, and globose. The remainder are medially angled, suturally impressed and longitudinally ribbed. The ribs are broad, rather irregular, rounded and oblique. The whole surface is crossed very delicately by close revolving sulculose striae. The aperture is oblong. The anal sinus (in type specimen) is hardly expressed, but the shell may not have quite reached its full growth. The outer lip is thin. The columella is straight. The wide siphonal canal is abbreviate.

== Distribution ==
This marine species occurs in the demersal zone off South Africa.
