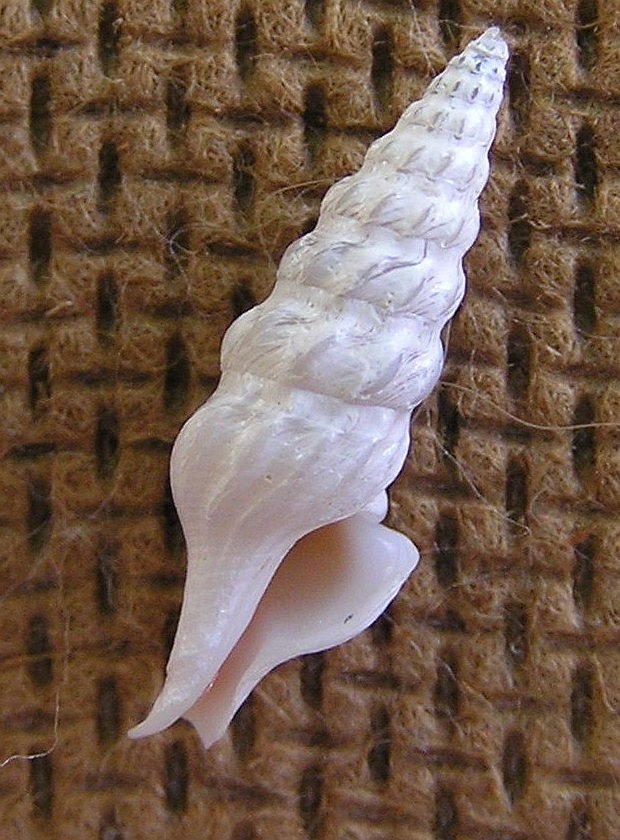
- Apertural view of a shell of Agladrillia pudica

Scientific classification
- Kingdom: Animalia
- Phylum: Mollusca
- Class: Gastropoda
- Subclass: Caenogastropoda
- Order: Neogastropoda
- Superfamily: Conoidea
- Family: Drilliidae
- Genus: Agladrillia; Woodring, 1928

Type species
- †Agladrillia callothyra Woodring, 1928

Species
- See text

= Agladrillia =

Genus of gastropods

Agladrillia is a genus of sea snails, marine gastropod mollusks in the family Drilliidae.

== Description ==
A specific characteristic for this genus is that the outer lip is strongly drawn in towards the base.

(Description by W.P. Woodring) The shell is small and moderately slender, with the body whorl featuring a varix some distance from the outer lip. The protoconch is rather stout, consisting of about two smooth whorls.

The aperture is long and narrow, with an anterior canal that is strongly constricted. The siphonal notch is moderately deep and asymmetrical, with a siphonal fasciole that is hardly inflated. The base of the outer lip has a relatively deep notch, and the inner lip is detached. The anal sinus is deep and adjoins the suture, with a rounded apex. The parietal wall is heavily callused where it adjoins the suture. The sculpture of the shell consists of narrow axial ribs and spiral threads or grooves. The anal fasciole bears a swelling across which obscure prolongations of the axial ribs extend.

This genus is proposed for small “Drillias” that have a narrow aperture, definitely formed anterior canal, rather deep stromboid notch on the outer lip, and an asymmetrical siphonal notch. The sculpture of Agladrillia s. s. consists of axials and spirals and the anal fasciole is set off by discrepant sculpture.

== Species ==
Species within the genus Agladrillia include:

- Agladrillia anadelgado Rolán et al., 2007
- Agladrillia aureola Fallon, 2016
- Agladrillia badia McLean & Poorman, 1971
- Agladrillia benjamini (Bartsch, 1915)
- † Agladrillia callothyra Woodring, 1928
- Agladrillia flucticulus McLean & Poorman, 1971
- Agladrillia fuegiensis (Smith E. A., 1888)
- Agladrillia gorgonensis McLean & Poorman, 1971
- Agladrillia leptalea W.P. Woodring, 1928
- Agladrillia macella (Melvill, 1923)
- † Agladrillia nakazaense MacNeil, 1961
- Agladrillia nitens (Hinds, 1843)
- Agladrillia piscorum Kilburn, 1988
- Agladrillia plicatella (Dall, 1908)
- Agladrillia pudica (Hinds, 1843)
- Agladrillia rhodochroa (Dautzenberg, 1900)
- Agladrillia torquata Fallon, 2016
- Agladrillia ukuminxa Kilburn, 1988

Species brought into synonymy

- † Agladrillia oyamai Shuto, 1965: synonym of † Thelecytharella oyamai (Shuto, 1965), synonym of Otitoma oyamai (Shuto, 1965)
- † Agladrillia serra Woodring, 1928: synonym of Eumetadrillia serra (Woodring, 1928)
