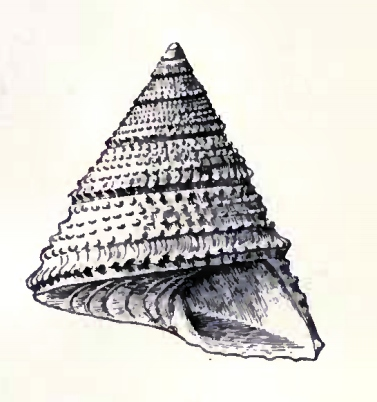
- View of a shell of Calliostoma indiana

Scientific classification
- Kingdom: Animalia
- Phylum: Mollusca
- Class: Gastropoda
- Subclass: Vetigastropoda
- Order: Trochida
- Family: Calliostomatidae
- Subfamily: Calliostomatinae
- Genus: Calliostoma
- Species: C. indiana

Binomial name
- Calliostoma indiana Dall, 1889

Synonyms
- Callistoma (Eucasta) indiana Dall, 1889

= Calliostoma indiana =

Species of gastropod

Calliostoma indiana is a species of sea snail, a marine gastropod mollusk in the family Calliostomatidae.

== Description ==
Calliostoma indiana is the type of Dall's section Eucasta, characterized by a moderate sulcus near the periphery on the shell, producing a fasciole as in Pleurotomaria. The height of the shell attains 11 mm. The thin shell has a conical shape. It is yellowish, with faint brown articulations on the spirals. It has a minute sinistral nucleus, and six and a half whorls. Its radiating sculpture consists of flexuous incremental lines, and fine wrinkles, which are more prominent toward the periphery on the body whorl and on the early whorls reticulate the spiral sculpture. On the body whorl these lines extend backward with moderate obliquity to the periphery, just above which is the fasciole caused by a well-marked but shallow rounded sulcus. On the base they make a deep rounded concave sweep backward, and then ascend toward the base of the columella. The spiral sculpture on the early whorls comprise two sharp narrow little elevated threads at the periphery, three, less contiguous, above the fasciole, and one near the suture, neatly reticulated by the wrinkles and minutely nodulous at the intersections. The spirals over most of the shell are strap-like, flattened, narrow, and distinctly marked off from the impressed broader interspaces. On the body whorl there is a single smooth flat thread below the nodulated one next the suture, and two run in the middle of the fasciole. The peripheral thread has become single and much stronger than the others. On the base of the shell there are seven spirals, faintly nodulous, articulated with pale brown, and separated by much wider impressed interspaces, over which are a few fine spiral lines. The base is flattened, or even a little concave. The columella is moderately arcuate. The aperture is four-sided. There is no umbilical pit.

== Distribution ==
This species occurs in the Caribbean Sea off Honduras, Grenada and Barbados.
