= Agladrillia plicatella =

Scientific classification
- Kingdom: Animalia
- Phylum: Mollusca
- Class: Gastropoda
- Subclass: Caenogastropoda
- Order: Neogastropoda
- Superfamily: Conoidea
- Family: Drilliidae
- Genus: Agladrillia
- Species: A. plicatella

Binomial name
- Agladrillia plicatella (Dall, 1908)
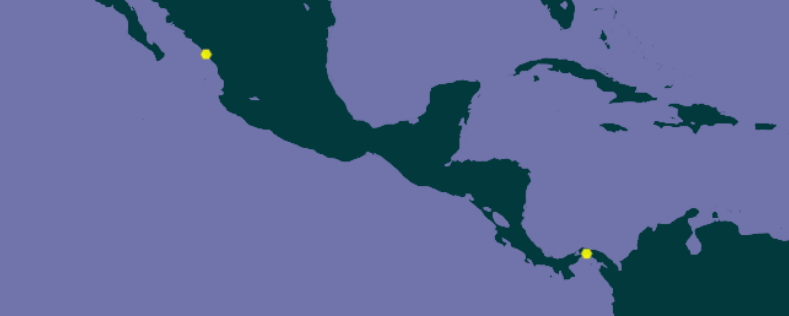

Synonyms
- Clathurella plicatella Dall, 1908

Species of gastropod

Agladrillia plicatella is a species of sea snail, a marine gastropod mollusk in the family Drilliidae.

== Description ==
The shell grows to a length of 7 mm, its diameter 2.5 mm.

(Original description) The very small, acute shell consists of eight whorls. It has a flesh-colored or pinkish hue and a polished appearance. The protoconch is turbinate, blunt, polished, smooth, and contains about two whorls.

The subsequent whorls are axially sculptured with (on the body whorl behind the node) ten sharp, slightly sigmoid, and slightly protractive ribs extending from the suture to the siphonal canal and from suture to suture on the spire, with wider interspaces. The suture is impressed, and just in front of it, there is a slight constriction corresponding to an anal fasciole, though no actual fasciole is visible.

The aperture is moderate in size. The anal sulcus is relatively large for the size of the shell. It is rounded and deep. The outer lip is rounded and prominent. A small mass of callus on the body limits the posterior edge of the sulcus. The body is smooth and callous, with enamel extending onto the columella, which is short and attenuated. The siphonal canal is short and recurved, with fine, sharp, spiral striations on the back that do not extend over the curvature of the whorl.

== Distribution ==
This marine species occurs in Panama Bay and off Mexico.
