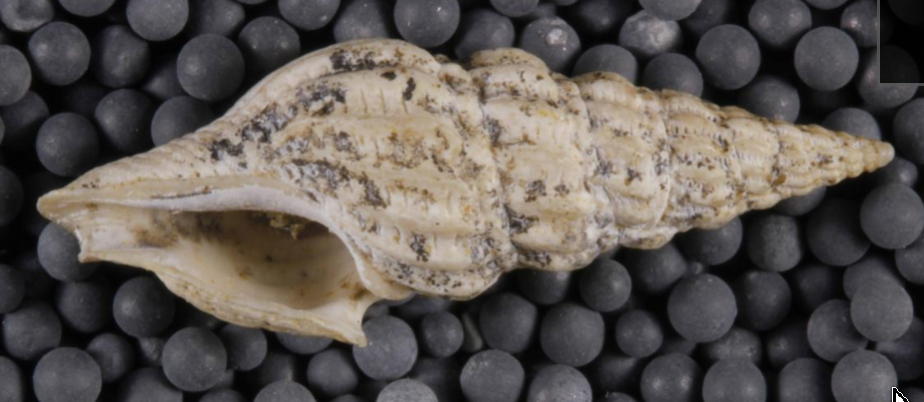
- Shell of † Agladrillia callothyra (holotype at the Smithsonian Institution)

Scientific classification
- Kingdom: Animalia
- Phylum: Mollusca
- Class: Gastropoda
- Subclass: Caenogastropoda
- Order: Neogastropoda
- Superfamily: Conoidea
- Family: Drilliidae
- Genus: Agladrillia
- Species: A. callothyra

Binomial name
- Agladrillia callothyra Woodring, 1928

Synonyms
- †Agladrillia (Agladrillia) callothyra, W. P. Woodring 1928

= Agladrillia callothyra =

Extinct species of gastropod

Agladrillia callothyra is an extinct species of sea snail, a marine gastropod mollusk in the family Drilliidae.

It is the type species of the genus Agladrillia.

== Description ==
The height of the shell attains 19.5 mm, its diameter 7.1 mm.

(Original description) The shell is small and moderately slender, with a nucleus consisting of about two whorls. The aperture aligns with the genus description. The sculpture features narrow axial ribs, between which lie broad spiral bands separated by narrow grooves. The anal fasciole has a swelling adjacent to the suture, which is crudely undulated by obscure prolongations of the axial ribs.

== Distribution ==
This extinct marine species was found in Pliocene strata on Jamaica.
