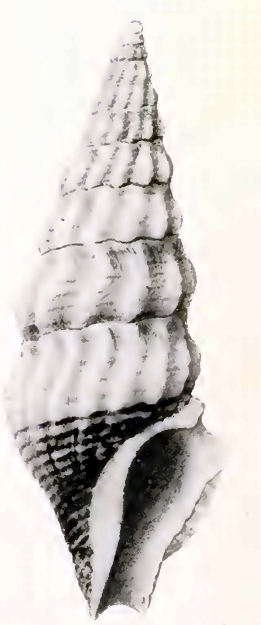
- Kylix ianthe

Scientific classification
- Kingdom: Animalia
- Phylum: Mollusca
- Class: Gastropoda
- Subclass: Caenogastropoda
- Order: Neogastropoda
- Superfamily: Conoidea
- Family: Drilliidae
- Genus: Kylix; Dall, 1919

Type species
- Clathrodrillia alcyone Dall, 1919

Species
- See text

= Kylix (gastropod) =

Genus of gastropods

Kylix is a genus of sea snails, marine gastropod mollusks in the family Drilliidae.

Species in this genus are characterized by an incised sculpture, a simple aperture and a more delicate shell. They have a dorsal varix, a protrusion on the back of the body whorl.

== Species ==
Species within the genus Kylix include:

- Kylix alcyone (Dall, 1919)
- Kylix contracta McLean & Poorman, 1971
- Kylix halocydne (Dall, 1919)
- Kylix hecuba (Dall, 1919)
- Kylix ianthe (Dall, 1919)
- Kylix impressa (Hinds, 1843)
- Kylix panamella (Dall, 1908)
- Kylix paziana (Dall, 1919)
- Kylix rugifera (Sowerby I, 1834)
- Kylix woodringi McLean & Poorman, 1971
- Kylix zacae Hertlein & Strong, 1951

Species brought into synonymy

- Kylix albemarlensis H.A. Pilsbry & E.G. Vanatta, 1902: synonym of: Kylix rugifera (G.B. I Sowerby, 1834)
- Kylix alcmene Dall, 1919: synonym of Calliclava alcmene (Dall, 1919)
- Kylix turveri Hertlein, L.G. & A.M. Strong, 1951: synonym of Calliclava alcmene (Dall, 1919)
