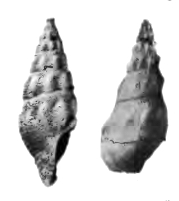
- Shell of Agladrillia nakazaense (holotype)

Scientific classification
- Kingdom: Animalia
- Phylum: Mollusca
- Class: Gastropoda
- Subclass: Caenogastropoda
- Order: Neogastropoda
- Family: Drilliidae
- Genus: Agladrillia
- Species: †A. nakazaense

Binomial name
- †Agladrillia nakazaense MacNeil, 1961

= Agladrillia nakazaense =

Extinct species of gastropod

Agladrillia nakazaense is an extinct species of sea snail, a marine gastropod mollusk in the family Drilliidae.

== Description ==
The length of the shell attains 17 mm (0.67 in), its diameter 6.4 mm (0.25 in).

(Original description) The shell is medium to moderately inflated with rounded whorls. The protoconch is missing in the type specimen. The aperture is less than half the length of the shell and extends anteriorly to form a short, well-defined siphonal canal. The parietal callus is thin except for a small bulge adjacent to the anal sinus.

The sculpture consists of moderately heavy axial ribs, about 5 to 6 visible from an angle, crossed by narrow but sharp raised threads. These threads are somewhat narrower on the subsutural slope and often have secondary threads on the lower part of the columella. The anal fasciole is not distinct because the axial ribs reach nearly to the subsutural collar, and the collar dips gently between the axial ribs.

== Distribution ==
This extinct marine species was found in Miocene or Pliocene strata on Okinawa, Japan.
