= Agladrillia ukuminxa =

Scientific classification
- Kingdom: Animalia
- Phylum: Mollusca
- Class: Gastropoda
- Subclass: Caenogastropoda
- Order: Neogastropoda
- Superfamily: Conoidea
- Family: Drilliidae
- Genus: Agladrillia
- Species: A. ukuminxa

Binomial name
- Agladrillia ukuminxa Kilburn, 1988

Species of gastropod

Agladrillia ukuminxa is a species of sea snail, a marine gastropod mollusk in the family Drilliidae.

== Description ==
The length of the shell attains 9 mm. Ukuminxa means choke in Xhosa.

== Distribution ==
This marine species occurs along Transkei, South Africa.
