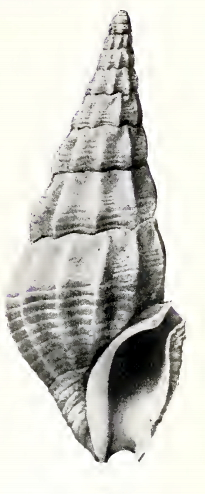
- Original image of a shell of Drillia aerope

Scientific classification
- Kingdom: Animalia
- Phylum: Mollusca
- Class: Gastropoda
- Subclass: Caenogastropoda
- Order: Neogastropoda
- Superfamily: Conoidea
- Family: Drilliidae
- Genus: Drillia
- Species: D. aerope

Binomial name
- Drillia aerope (W.H. Dall, 1919)

Synonyms
- Clavus aerope DuShane & R. Poorman, 1967; Elaeocyma aerope Dall, 1919 (original description)

= Drillia aerope =

Species of gastropod

Drillia aerope is a species of sea snail, a marine gastropod mollusk in the family Drilliidae.

== Description ==
The shell grows to a length of 16 mm.

The small, acute shell is whitish. It has a polished, smooth, trochiform protoconch of about 2½ whorls. The teleoconch contains the subsequent eight or more whorls. The suture is distinct and slightly appressed. The anal fasciole is slightly constricted. The spiral sculpture consists of sharp narrow grooves, with much wider flat smooth interspaces.

There are about eleven of the grooves on the body whorl between the shoulder and the spirally threaded siphonal fasciole. The anal fasciole is not spirally striate. The axial sculpture consists of (on the body whorl about 10) sharp-edged ribs, with wider interspaces, compressed and arcuate on the anal fasciole, nearly vertical elsewhere and extending over the whole whorl, but not continuous over the spire. The incremental lines are inconspicuous. The aperture is rather wide and short with a deep rounded anal sulcus and a prominent subsutural callosity. The outer lip is subvaricose, sharp-edged and smooth within. The inner lip shows a thick layer of enamel. Its outer edge is raised with a slight chink between it and the siphonal fasciole. The columella is short and straight. The siphonal canal is deep, short, wide, and slightly recurved.

The shell's combination of spiral grooves, axial ribs and a distinct anal fasciole is characteristic of several marine gastropods in the family Pseudomelatomidae. These features are important in the identification and classification of sea snails, as shell sculpture, whorl shape and aperture structure are commonly used to distinguish closely related species. The short, recurved siphonal canal is another notable feature of the shell's morphology.

== Distribution ==
This species occurs off Agua Verde Bay, Gulf of California, Western Mexico
