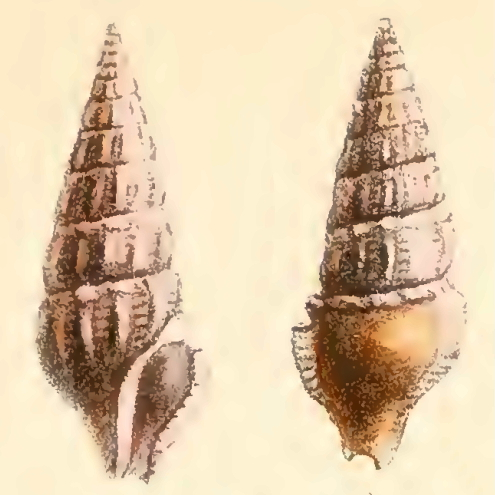
- Original image of a shell of Agladrillia rhodochroa

Scientific classification
- Kingdom: Animalia
- Phylum: Mollusca
- Class: Gastropoda
- Subclass: Caenogastropoda
- Order: Neogastropoda
- Superfamily: Conoidea
- Family: Drilliidae
- Genus: Agladrillia
- Species: A. rhodochroa

Binomial name
- Agladrillia rhodochroa (Dautzenberg, 1900)

Synonyms
- Drillia rhodochroa Dautzenberg, 1900 (original combination)

= Agladrillia rhodochroa =

Species of gastropod

Agladrillia rhodochroa is a species of sea snail, a marine gastropod mollusk in the family Drilliidae.

== Description ==
The length of the shell varies between 8 mm and 25 mm.

(Original description - in French) The shell is solid and polished, exhibiting a flesh-colored or pinkish hue. It is acute and turriculated, consisting of 10 slightly convex whorls, separated by an oppressed suture. The protoconch features two smooth, papillary whorls. The whorls of the teleoconch are marked by oblique, strong, longitudinal ribs that are approximately equal in width to their interspaces. These interspaces are adorned with decurrent, regularly spaced furrows and slightly visible growth lines. On the dorsal region of the body whorl, only these furrows and growth lines are visible, bordered on one side by the edge of the lip and on the other by a final longitudinal, variciform rib. The oval aperture terminates in a short, open siphonal canal. The columella is almost straight and displays a thick callus. The sharp outer lip is topped with a very deep sinus.

== Distribution ==
This species occurs in the Caribbean Sea off Colombia.
