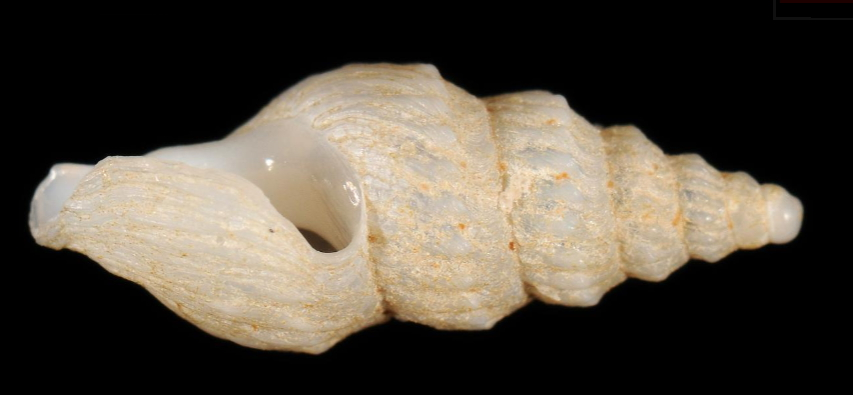
- Shell of Agladrillia fuegiensis (specimen at the Smithsonian Institution)

Scientific classification
- Kingdom: Animalia
- Phylum: Mollusca
- Class: Gastropoda
- Subclass: Caenogastropoda
- Order: Neogastropoda
- Superfamily: Conoidea
- Family: Drilliidae
- Genus: Agladrillia
- Species: A. fuegiensis

Binomial name
- Agladrillia fuegiensis (E.A. Smith, 1888)
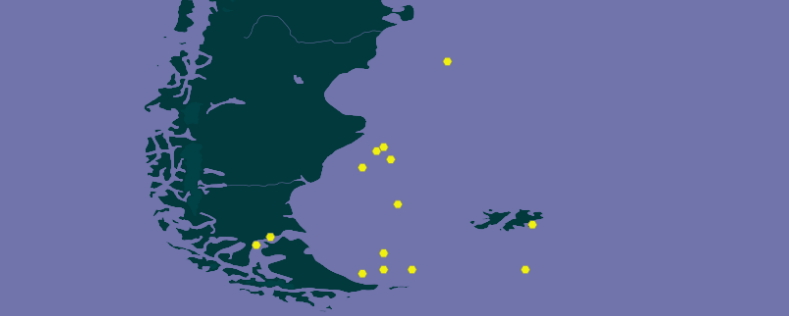

Synonyms
- Eumetadrillia fuegiensis Carcelles & Williamson, 1951; Pleurotoma (Surcula) fuegiensis E.A. Smith, 1888 (original description); Pleurotoma fuegiensis E. A. Smith, 1888 (original combination)

= Agladrillia fuegiensis =

Species of gastropod

Agladrillia fuegiensis is a species of sea snail, a marine gastropod mollusk in the family Drilliidae.

== Description ==
The size of an adult shell varies between 8 mm and 20 mm.

(Original description) The shell, characterized by its short, fusiform shape, displays a striking purplish-pink hue. Its base is a paler shade, providing a subtle contrast. The shell comprises seven whorls, including the two large, obtuse whorls of the protoconch. The oblique ribs are most prominent at their upper ends. The purplish-pink color intensifies at the midpoint of the body whorl, forming a faint spiral band. The aperture constitutes two-fifths of the shell's total length. The thin outer lip has a sinuate form near the suture. The columella is slightly curved in the middle and oblique at the base. The short siphonal canal is wide and gently recurved.

== Distribution ==
This marine species occurs off Tierra del Fuego, the Strait of Magellan and off the Falklands.
