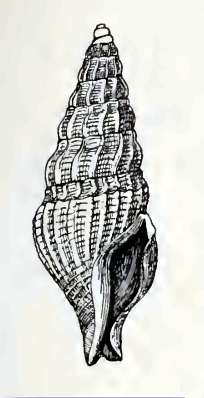
- Original image of a shell of Kylix panamella

Scientific classification
- Kingdom: Animalia
- Phylum: Mollusca
- Class: Gastropoda
- Subclass: Caenogastropoda
- Order: Neogastropoda
- Superfamily: Conoidea
- Family: Drilliidae
- Genus: Kylix
- Species: K. panamella

Binomial name
- Kylix panamella (Dall, 1908)

Synonyms
- Agladrillia panamella (Dall, 1908); Clathurella panamella Dall, 1908 (basionym)

= Kylix panamella =

Species of gastropod

Kylix panamella is a species of sea snail, a marine gastropod mollusk in the family Drilliidae.

== Description ==
The shell grows to a length of 14 mm, its diameter 6 mm.

(Original description) The small, polished shell is white, with, on the body whorl and in the throat, a livid pinkish tint. The shell contains 10 whorls. The protoconch is eroded, but its first whorl is flattish and appears from above discoid and glassy. The subsequent whorls are glistening, constricted and appressed at the suture. These whorls contain (on the penultimate whorl eighteen) arcuate and protractive axial ribs which extend from the suture to the siphonal canal except over the last half of the body whorl. The constriction which indicates the anal fasciole gives the posterior edge of the whorl a marginate appearance, but does not interrupt the ribs, which are very prominent in front of the fasciole at the shoulder. The whole surface is evenly sculptured by strongly incised, almost channelled lines, with wider, flat, strap-like interspaces. Near the siphonal canal these become narrower and cord-like and the channels wider, diminishing again toward the end of the canal. The spiral sculpture does not nodulate the ribs, but is minutely crenulated on the eminences by fine, even, incremental lines. The aperture is short, wide, with a deep rounded anal sulcus next the suture, a thin and much produced outer lip, a short, slightly recurved, flaring siphonal canal. The arcuate columella is callous, white and smooth, with a conspicuous nodule on the body between the sulcus and the suture. The operculum is wanting. The first half of the body whorl in the adult ends in a node or varix, indicating a previous resting stage with developed outer lip. Beyond this the whorl is destitute of ribs.

== Distribution ==
This species occurs in the demersal zone of the Pacific Ocean off Panama at a depth of 280 m.
