= Kylix woodringi =

Scientific classification
- Kingdom: Animalia
- Phylum: Mollusca
- Class: Gastropoda
- Subclass: Caenogastropoda
- Order: Neogastropoda
- Superfamily: Conoidea
- Family: Drilliidae
- Genus: Kylix
- Species: K. woodringi

Binomial name
- Kylix woodringi McLean & Poorman, 1971

Species of gastropod

Kylix woodringi is a species of sea snail, a marine gastropod mollusk in the family Drilliidae. The species is named in honor of Wendell P. Woodring.

== Description ==
The size of an adult shell varies between 15 mm and 22 mm.

== Distribution ==
This species occurs in the demersal zone of the Pacific Ocean off Panama.
