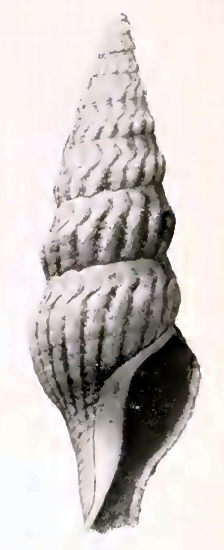
- Original image of a shell of Kylix alcyone

Scientific classification
- Kingdom: Animalia
- Phylum: Mollusca
- Class: Gastropoda
- Subclass: Caenogastropoda
- Order: Neogastropoda
- Superfamily: Conoidea
- Family: Drilliidae
- Genus: Kylix
- Species: K. alcyone

Binomial name
- Kylix alcyone (Dall, 1919)

Synonyms
- Clathrodrillia (Kylix) alcyone Dall, 1919 (basionym); Clavus (Cymatosyrinx) alcyone (Dall, 1919)

= Kylix alcyone =

Species of gastropod

Kylix alcyone is a species of sea snail, a marine gastropod mollusk in the family Drilliidae.

== Description ==
The shell grows to a length of 15 mm, with a diameter of 4.5 mm.

The small, slender shell is acute. It is white and polished, comprising about nine whorls (the protoconch is decorticated). The suture is distinct and not appressed. The anal fasciole lies adjacent to the suture, with no thickened cord between. The whorls are well-rounded, but the fasciole is somewhat flattened.

The spiral sculpture consists of sharply incised lines—two on the early whorls and about 15 on the body whorl—located in front of the shoulder. These lines cut the ribs into squarish segments that are barely nodulous. On the siphonal canal, there are a few finer, closely set threads.

The axial sculpture comprises rounded, somewhat sigmoid ribs—about 21 on the penultimate whorl—that extend from the suture to the base. These ribs are feeble on the fasciole and the base of the shell, and obsolete on the last half of the body whorl. The anal fasciole is wide and shows the arcuate posterior ends of the ribs, which do not undulate the suture.

The aperture is narrow. The anal sulcus is wide and rounded with a slightly flaring edge. The outer lip is thin, sharp, and prominently arcuately produced. The inner lip is erased. The columella is strong and attenuated anteriorly. The siphonal canal is distinct, narrow, and somewhat recurved.[2]

== Distribution ==
This species occurs in the demersal zone of the Pacific Ocean off Cape Lobos, in the Gulf of California, Western Mexico, at a depth of 140 meters.
