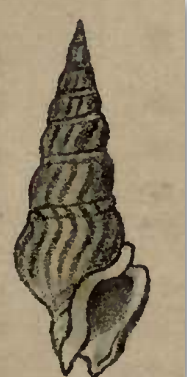
- Apertural view of a shell Calliclava pallida

Scientific classification
- Kingdom: Animalia
- Phylum: Mollusca
- Class: Gastropoda
- Subclass: Caenogastropoda
- Order: Neogastropoda
- Superfamily: Conoidea
- Family: Drilliidae
- Genus: Calliclava
- Species: C. pallida

Binomial name
- Calliclava pallida (Sowerby I, 1834)

Synonyms
- Drillia pallida Sowerby I, 1834; Pleurotoma pallida Sowerby I, 1834

= Calliclava pallida =

Species of mollusc

Calliclava pallida is a species of sea snail, a marine gastropod mollusk in the family Drilliidae.

== Description ==
The shell grows to a length of 24 mm. The ribs are deflected at the periphery but continuous to the suture, sharp and rather close, interstices with fine revolving striae. The anal sinus is broad and deep. The siphonal canal is very short and a little recurved. The ground color of the shell is white.

== Distribution ==
This species occurs in the Pacific Ocean from Mexico to Colombia.
