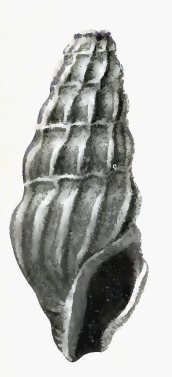
- Shell of Calliclava palmeri

Scientific classification
- Kingdom: Animalia
- Phylum: Mollusca
- Class: Gastropoda
- Subclass: Caenogastropoda
- Order: Neogastropoda
- Superfamily: Conoidea
- Family: Drilliidae
- Genus: Calliclava; McLean, 1971

Type species
- Cymatosyrinx palmeri Dall, 1919

= Calliclava =

Genus of gastropods

Calliclava is a genus of sea snails, marine gastropod mollusks in the family Drilliidae.

== Species ==
Species within the genus Calliclava include:

- Calliclava aegina (Dall, 1919)
- Calliclava albolaqueata (Carpenter, 1865)
- Calliclava alcmene (Dall, 1919)
- Calliclava craneana (Hertlein & Strong, 1951)
- Calliclava jaliscoensis McLean & Poorman, 1971
- Calliclava lucida McLean & Poorman, 1971
- Calliclava pallida (Sowerby I, 1834)
- Calliclava palmeri (Dall, 1919)
- Calliclava rhodina McLean & Poorman, 1971
- Calliclava subtilis McLean & Poorman, 1971
- Calliclava tobagoensis Fallon, 2016
- Calliclava vigorata Fallon, 2016
