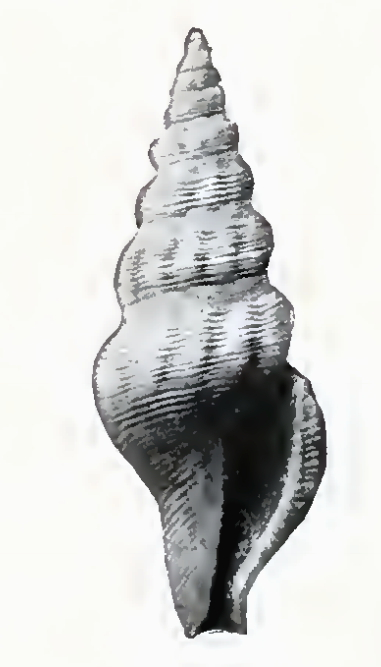
- Original image of a shell of Agladrillia benjamini

Scientific classification
- Kingdom: Animalia
- Phylum: Mollusca
- Class: Gastropoda
- Subclass: Caenogastropoda
- Order: Neogastropoda
- Superfamily: Conoidea
- Family: Drilliidae
- Genus: Agladrillia
- Species: A. benjamini

Binomial name
- Agladrillia benjamini (Bartsch, 1915)

Synonyms
- Mangilia benjamini Bartsch, 1915

= Agladrillia benjamini =

Species of gastropod

Agladrillia benjamini is a species of sea snail, a marine gastropod mollusk in the family Drilliidae.

== Description ==
The length of the species attains 15.3 mm, its diameter 5.7 mm.

(Original description) The elongate-conic shell is flesh-colored, with a protoconch that contains more than one smooth whorl. The whorls of the teleoconch are strongly rounded. The sinus is located at the summit, where the whorls are somewhat contracted.

The surface of the teleoconch whorls features strong, rounded, protracted axial ribs, which start just anterior to the sinus and extend prominently to the periphery, becoming less defined anteriorly on the body whorl. These ribs number 10 on the first to fourth whorls, 12 on the fifth to seventh, and 14 on the penultimate whorl. The axial ribs are about as wide as the spaces separating them.

In addition to the axial ribs, the whorls are adorned with numerous slender spiral threads. About five spiral threads are present in the sinus area on the last three whorls, which are finer than those covering the rest of the whorl between the sutures. There are three spiral threads on the first to third whorls, four on the fourth, seven on the fifth and sixth, eleven on the next, and thirteen on the last turn.

The spaces between the spiral threads are approximately equal in strength to the threads themselves. The surface between the spiral threads is covered with fine granulations on the spire. The body whorl, just before the periphery, is marked by 27 spiral cords that are about equal in size and spacing, becoming only slightly stronger on the columella. The sutures are well constricted. The aperture has a strong, deep sinus at its posterior angle, making the outer lip, anterior to this, distinctly claw-like. The outer lip is strongly reinforced internally by a callus that has about 15 denticulations on its inner surface. The columella and the parietal wall are glazed with a thin callus.

== Distribution ==
This marine species occurs off South Africa.
