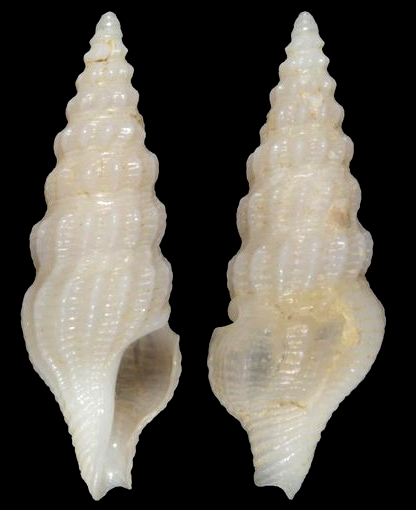
- Shell of Agladrillia gorgonensis (holotype at Natural History Museum of Los Angeles County)

Scientific classification
- Kingdom: Animalia
- Phylum: Mollusca
- Class: Gastropoda
- Subclass: Caenogastropoda
- Order: Neogastropoda
- Superfamily: Conoidea
- Family: Drilliidae
- Genus: Agladrillia
- Species: A. gorgonensis

Binomial name
- Agladrillia gorgonensis McLean & Poorman, 1971

= Agladrillia gorgonensis =

Species of gastropod

Agladrillia gorgonensis is a species of sea snail, a marine gastropod mollusk in the family Drilliidae.

== Distribution ==
This species occurs in the Pacific Ocean from Mexico to Colombia.
