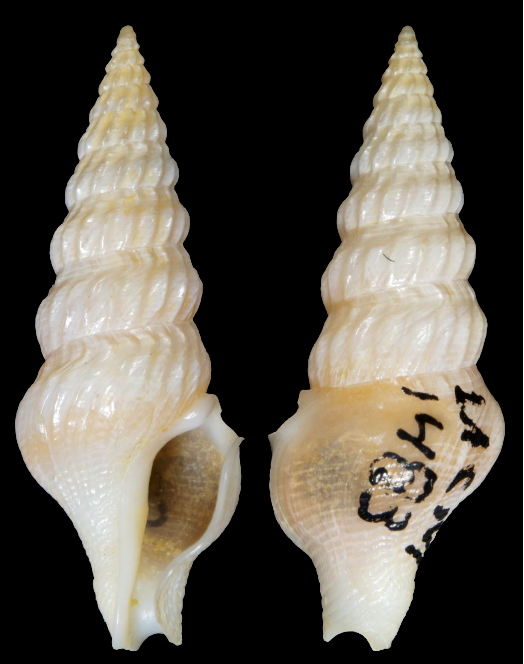
- Shell of Agladrillia flucticulus (holotype at the Natural History Museum of Los Angeles County)

Scientific classification
- Kingdom: Animalia
- Phylum: Mollusca
- Class: Gastropoda
- Subclass: Caenogastropoda
- Order: Neogastropoda
- Superfamily: Conoidea
- Family: Drilliidae
- Genus: Agladrillia
- Species: A. flucticulus

Binomial name
- Agladrillia flucticulus McLean & Poorman, 1971

= Agladrillia flucticulus =

Species of gastropod

Agladrillia flucticulus is a species of sea snail, a marine gastropod mollusk in the family Drilliidae.

== Description ==
The length of the shell attains 12 mm.

== Distribution ==
This species occurs in the Pacific Ocean from Mexico to Panama and Ecuador.
