= Elaeocyma arenensis =

Scientific classification
- Kingdom: Animalia
- Phylum: Mollusca
- Class: Gastropoda
- Subclass: Caenogastropoda
- Order: Neogastropoda
- Superfamily: Conoidea
- Family: Drilliidae
- Genus: Elaeocyma
- Species: E. arenensis

Binomial name
- Elaeocyma arenensis (Hertlein & Strong, 1951)

Synonyms
- Clavus (Cymatosyrinx) arenensis Parker, 1964; Cymatosyrinx arenensis Hertlein & Strong, 1951; Cymatosyrinx (Elaeocyma) arenensis Abbott, 1974 (basionym)

Species of gastropod

Elaeocyma arenensis is a species of sea snail, a marine gastropod mollusk in the family Drilliidae.

== Description ==
The shell grows to a length of 45 mm.

== Distribution ==
This species occurs in the demersal zone of the Eastern Pacific Ocean off the Gulf of California, and Western Mexico.
