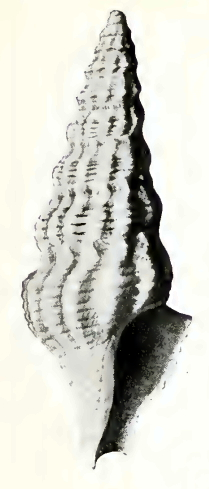
- Original image of a shell of Kylix paziana

Scientific classification
- Kingdom: Animalia
- Phylum: Mollusca
- Class: Gastropoda
- Subclass: Caenogastropoda
- Order: Neogastropoda
- Superfamily: Conoidea
- Family: Drilliidae
- Genus: Kylix
- Species: K. paziana

Binomial name
- Kylix paziana (Dall, 1919)

Synonyms
- Clathrodrillia paziana Dall, 1919

= Kylix paziana =

Species of gastropod

Kylix paziana is a species of sea snail, a marine gastropod mollusk in the family Drilliidae.

== Description ==
The size of an adult shell varies between 12 mm and 17 mm; its diameter is 5 mm.

(Original description) The small, acute shell is pale olivaceous. It contains 10 whorls, of which the first in the protoconch is smooth and the second obscurely peripherally keeled. The subsequent whorls are normally sculptured. The suture is distinct The periphery of the upper whorls is nearer the succeeding than the preceding suture. The anal fasciole is constricted but crossed by the ribs. The spiral sculpture consists of (on the upper whorls 4 or 5, on the body whorl about 14) strong cords with narrower groove-like interspaces, extending from the fasciole to the siphonal canal. The cords are not swollen where they cross the ribs. The axial sculpture consists of (on the penultimate whorl 13, on the body whorl 10) rounded ribs with subequal interspaces, strongest at the shoulder, extending from suture to the base. The incremental lines are rather strong on the fasciole. The anal sulcus is deep and rounded with a callous margin. The outer lip is arcuate and thin. The inner lip is simple. The siphonal canal is slightly recurved.

== Distribution ==
This species occurs in the demersal zone of the Pacific Ocean from the Gulf of California, Western Mexico, to Panama.
