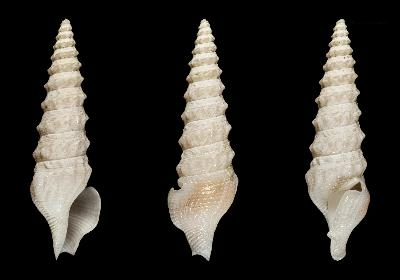
- Shell of Agladrillia torquata (holotype in the MNHN, Paris)

Scientific classification
- Kingdom: Animalia
- Phylum: Mollusca
- Class: Gastropoda
- Subclass: Caenogastropoda
- Order: Neogastropoda
- Superfamily: Conoidea
- Family: Drilliidae
- Genus: Agladrillia
- Species: A. torquata

Binomial name
- Agladrillia torquata Fallon, 2016

= Agladrillia torquata =

Species of gastropod

Agladrillia torquata is a species of sea snail, a marine gastropod mollusc in the family Drilliidae.

== Description ==
The length of the shell varies between 7 mm and 22 mm.

== Distribution ==
This species occurs in the Caribbean Sea off the coast of French Guiana.
