= Agladrillia anadelgado =

Scientific classification
- Kingdom: Animalia
- Phylum: Mollusca
- Class: Gastropoda
- Subclass: Caenogastropoda
- Order: Neogastropoda
- Superfamily: Conoidea
- Family: Drilliidae
- Genus: Agladrillia
- Species: A. anadelgado

Binomial name
- Agladrillia anadelgado Rolán et al., 2007

Species of gastropod

Agladrillia anadelgado is a species of sea snail, a marine gastropod mollusc in the family Drilliidae.

== Distribution ==
This species occurs in the Atlantic Ocean off Angola at depth between 40 m and 60 m.
