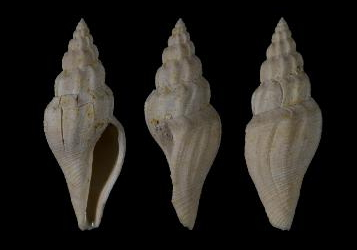
- Shell of † Elaeocyma plicata (specimen at MNHN, Paris)

Scientific classification
- Kingdom: Animalia
- Phylum: Mollusca
- Class: Gastropoda
- Subclass: Caenogastropoda
- Order: Neogastropoda
- Superfamily: Conoidea
- Family: Drilliidae
- Genus: Elaeocyma
- Species: E. plicata

Binomial name
- Elaeocyma plicata (Lamarck, 1803)

Synonyms
- † Daphnella (Raphitoma) plicata (Lamarck, 1804); † Mangelia pseudoharpula (d'Orbigny, 1850); † Pleurotoma plicata Lamarck, 1803; † Raphitoma plicata (Lamarck, 1803)

= Elaeocyma plicata =

Extinct species of gastropod

Elaeocyma plicata is an extinct species of sea snail, a marine gastropod mollusk in the family Drilliidae.

== Distribution ==
This extinct species was found in strata of the Eocene of the United Kingdom; age range: 37.2 to 33.9 Ma; in strata of the Lutetian in France.
