= Calliclava tobagoensis =

Scientific classification
- Kingdom: Animalia
- Phylum: Mollusca
- Class: Gastropoda
- Subclass: Caenogastropoda
- Order: Neogastropoda
- Superfamily: Conoidea
- Family: Drilliidae
- Genus: Calliclava
- Species: C. tobagoensis

Binomial name
- Calliclava tobagoensis Fallon, 2016

Species of gastropod

Calliclava tobagoensis is a species of sea snail, a marine gastropod mollusc in the family Drilliidae.

== Description ==
The length of the shell varies between 7 mm and 13 mm.

== Distribution ==
This species occurs in the Caribbean Sea off the Netherlands Antilles and Trinidad and Tobago.
