= Kylix contracta =

Scientific classification
- Kingdom: Animalia
- Phylum: Mollusca
- Class: Gastropoda
- Subclass: Caenogastropoda
- Order: Neogastropoda
- Superfamily: Conoidea
- Family: Drilliidae
- Genus: Kylix
- Species: K. contracta

Binomial name
- Kylix contracta McLean & Poorman, 1971

Species of gastropod

Kylix contracta is a species of sea snail, a marine gastropod mollusk in the family Drilliidae.

== Description ==
The size of an adult shell varies between 7 mm and 13 mm.

== Distribution ==
This species occurs in the demersal zone of the Pacific Ocean between Panama and Ecuador at depths between 73 m and 128 m.
