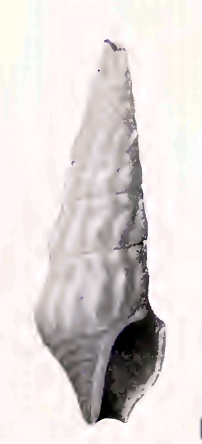
- Original image of Elaeocyma attalia

Scientific classification
- Kingdom: Animalia
- Phylum: Mollusca
- Class: Gastropoda
- Subclass: Caenogastropoda
- Order: Neogastropoda
- Superfamily: Conoidea
- Family: Drilliidae
- Genus: Elaeocyma
- Species: E. attalia

Binomial name
- Elaeocyma attalia W.H. Dall, 1919

= Elaeocyma attalia =

Species of gastropod

Elaeocyma attalia is a species of sea snail, a marine gastropod mollusk in the family Drilliidae.

== Description ==
The shell grows to a length of 8.5 mm, its diameter 3 mm.

(Original description) The small shell is slender and acute. The color of the shell is white and polished. It contains eight flattish whorls exclusive of the (lost) protoconch. The suture is obscure and appressed. The fasciole (a band of minute tubercles) is immediately adjacent, rather wide, and constricted. The spiral sculpture consists of a few incised lines on the base and threads on the siphonal canal. The axial sculpture consists of (on the penultimate whorl about fourteen) low feeble ribs, almost knoblike, stronger on the earlier whorls, but which do not reach the base or cross the anal fasciole and which disappear on the last half of the body whorl where there is a moundlike varix and traces of a yellowish spot. The aperture is small. The anal sulcus is deep, with a subsutural callus. The outer lip is thin, sharp and arcuately produced. The inner lip and columella show a thin layer of enamel. The columella is short. The siphonal canal is very short and hardly differentiated from the aperture.

== Distribution ==
This marine species occurs in the demersal zone of the Pacific Ocean coast of Western Mexico
