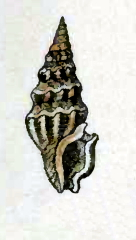
- Drawing of a shell of Agladrillia nitens

Scientific classification
- Kingdom: Animalia
- Phylum: Mollusca
- Class: Gastropoda
- Subclass: Caenogastropoda
- Order: Neogastropoda
- Superfamily: Conoidea
- Family: Drilliidae
- Genus: Agladrillia
- Species: A. nitens

Binomial name
- Agladrillia nitens (Hinds, 1843)

Synonyms
- Clavatula nitens Hinds, 1843 (original combination); Drillia (Clavatula) nitens (Hinds, 1843); Mangilia nitens Hinds, 1843; Pleurotoma nitens Reeve, 1846

= Agladrillia nitens =

Species of gastropod

Agladrillia nitens is a species of sea snail, a marine gastropod mollusk in the family Drilliidae.

== Description ==
The shell reaches a length of 12 mm and consists of 8 carinately shouldered whorls. It has a flesh-brown coloration. The sculpture of the shell consists of longitudinal, sharp, oblique ribs that are pointed at the shoulder angle and extend to the suture. Additionally, the shell features revolving striae. The outer lip is sharp, and the aperture is oval. The siphonal canal is short.

== Distribution ==
This marine species occurs off North Australia, New Guinea, New Caledonia, the Philippines and the Makassar Strait.
