= Calliclava rhodina =

Scientific classification
- Kingdom: Animalia
- Phylum: Mollusca
- Class: Gastropoda
- Subclass: Caenogastropoda
- Order: Neogastropoda
- Superfamily: Conoidea
- Family: Drilliidae
- Genus: Calliclava
- Species: C. rhodina

Binomial name
- Calliclava rhodina McLean & Poorman, 1971

Species of gastropod

Calliclava rhodina is a species of sea snail, a marine gastropod mollusk in the family Drilliidae.

== Description ==
The shell grows to a length of 18 mm.

== Distribution ==
This species occurs in the Pacific Ocean off Mexico.
