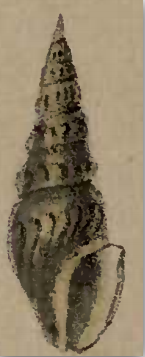
- Drawing of a shell of Elaeocyma splendidula

Scientific classification
- Kingdom: Animalia
- Phylum: Mollusca
- Class: Gastropoda
- Subclass: Caenogastropoda
- Order: Neogastropoda
- Superfamily: Conoidea
- Family: Drilliidae
- Genus: Elaeocyma
- Species: E. splendidula

Binomial name
- Elaeocyma splendidula (G.B. Sowerby I, 1834)

Synonyms
- Drillia (Crassispira) splendidula H. & A. Adams, 1853; Drillia (Drillia) splendidula Tryon, 1884; Pleurotoma splendidula Sowerby I, 1834 (basionym)

= Elaeocyma splendidula =

Species of gastropod

Elaeocyma splendidula is a species of sea snail, a marine gastropod mollusk in the family Drilliidae.

== Description ==
The shell grows to a length of 28 mm. The whorls are smooth. The shell is longitudinally ribbed below the tuberculate periphery. The tubercles and ribs are slight, the latter curved, and white upon a brownish rose-colored surface.

== Distribution ==
This species occurs in the demersal zone of the Pacific Ocean off the Galapagos Islands.
