= Agladrillia aureola =

Scientific classification
- Kingdom: Animalia
- Phylum: Mollusca
- Class: Gastropoda
- Subclass: Caenogastropoda
- Order: Neogastropoda
- Superfamily: Conoidea
- Family: Drilliidae
- Genus: Agladrillia
- Species: A. aureola

Binomial name
- Agladrillia aureola Fallon, 2016

Species of sea snail

Agladrillia aureola is a species of sea snail, a marine gastropod mollusc in the family Drilliidae.

== Description ==
The length of the shell attains 12 mm.

== Distribution ==
This species occurs in the Caribbean Sea off Venezuela.
