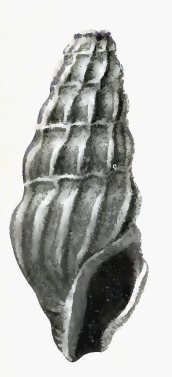
- Original image of a shell of Calliclava palmeri

Scientific classification
- Kingdom: Animalia
- Phylum: Mollusca
- Class: Gastropoda
- Subclass: Caenogastropoda
- Order: Neogastropoda
- Superfamily: Conoidea
- Family: Drilliidae
- Genus: Calliclava
- Species: C. palmeri

Binomial name
- Calliclava palmeri (Dall, 1919)

Synonyms
- Cymatosyrinx palmeri Dall, 1919

= Calliclava palmeri =

Species of gastropod

Calliclava palmeri is a species of sea snail, a marine gastropod mollusk in the family Drilliidae.

== Description ==
The (decollate) shell attains a length of 9.5 mm, its diameter 4 mm.

The shell contains six whorls exclusive of the (lost) protoconch. The suture is distinct, closely appressed, undulated by the axial sculpture. The anal fasciole is constricted. There is no spiral sculpture. The axial sculpture consists of (on the body whorl 10) rounded sigmoid ribs, feebler where they cross the fasciole, fading out on the base, and most prominent at the periphery, with subequal interspaces. The aperture is moderately wide. The anal sulcus is large, close to the suture, with a thick subsutural callus. The outer lip is thickened with no internal lirae, a knob-like varix a little way behind it. The body and the columella are callous. The siphonal sulcus is deep, the siphonal canal is wide, short and slightly recurved.

== Distribution ==
This species occurs in the Gulf of California, Western Mexico.
