= Elaeocyma amplinucis =

Scientific classification
- Kingdom: Animalia
- Phylum: Mollusca
- Class: Gastropoda
- Subclass: Caenogastropoda
- Order: Neogastropoda
- Superfamily: Conoidea
- Family: Drilliidae
- Genus: Elaeocyma
- Species: E. amplinucis

Binomial name
- Elaeocyma amplinucis McLean & Poorman, 1971

Species of gastropod

Elaeocyma amplinucis is a species of sea snail, a marine gastropod mollusk in the family Drilliidae. The species was first described in 1971 by marine biologists James H. McLean and Roy Poorman in the journal The Veliger, who classified it as a completely new species of snail distinct from the other species.

== Distribution ==
This species occurs in the demersal zone in the Pacific Ocean off the Galapagos Islands.
