= Conus woodringi =

Scientific classification
- Domain: Eukaryota
- Kingdom: Animalia
- Phylum: Mollusca
- Class: Gastropoda
- Subclass: Caenogastropoda
- Order: Neogastropoda
- Superfamily: Conoidea
- Family: Conidae
- Genus: Conus
- Species: †C. woodringi

Binomial name
- †Conus woodringi Hendricks, 2018

Synonyms
- Conus (Stephanoconus) woodringi Hendricks, 2018

Extinct species of gastropod

Conus woodringi is an extinct species of sea snail, a marine gastropod mollusk, in the family Conidae, the cone snails and their allies. The species is named in honor of Wendell P. Woodring.

== Distribution ==
This species occurs in Panama.
