= Agladrillia piscorum =

Scientific classification
- Kingdom: Animalia
- Phylum: Mollusca
- Class: Gastropoda
- Subclass: Caenogastropoda
- Order: Neogastropoda
- Superfamily: Conoidea
- Family: Drilliidae
- Genus: Agladrillia
- Species: A. piscorum

Binomial name
- Agladrillia piscorum Kilburn, 1988

Species of gastropod

Agladrillia piscorum is a species of sea snail, a marine gastropod mollusk in the family Drilliidae.

== Description ==
The length of the shell attains 12.6 mm. The teleoconch contains 6 convex whorls. The white shell shows no microscopic granules or labral ridges. The penultimate whorl contains 28-31 spiral threads and 10-11 strong, axial ribs. The base of the shell is moderately constricted. The siphonal canal is fairly broad and obliquely truncate. The parietal pad is terminal.

== Distribution ==
This marine species occurs in the Agulhas Bank, South Africa.
