= Crassispira woodringi =

Scientific classification
- Kingdom: Animalia
- Phylum: Mollusca
- Class: Gastropoda
- Subclass: Caenogastropoda
- Order: Neogastropoda
- Superfamily: Conoidea
- Family: Pseudomelatomidae
- Genus: Crassispira
- Species: C. woodringi

Binomial name
- Crassispira woodringi A.A. Olsson, 1930

Extinct species of gastropod

Crassispira woodringi is an extinct species of sea snail, a marine gastropod mollusk in the family Pseudomelatomidae, the turrids and allies. Fossils have been found in Eocene strata in Northern Peru; age range: 40.4 to 37.2 Ma. The species is named in honor of Wendell P. Woodring.

† Crassispira woodringi (A. Dey, 1961) (synonym: † Drillia (Crassispira) woodringi Dey 1961 is a junior homonym.
