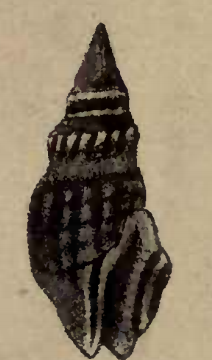
- Drawing of a shell of Kylix rugifera

Scientific classification
- Kingdom: Animalia
- Phylum: Mollusca
- Class: Gastropoda
- Subclass: Caenogastropoda
- Order: Neogastropoda
- Superfamily: Conoidea
- Family: Drilliidae
- Genus: Kylix
- Species: K. rugifera

Binomial name
- Kylix rugifera (G.B. Sowerby I, 1834)

Synonyms
- Drillia albemarlensis Pilsbry & Vanatta, 1902; Drillia (Crassispira) nigerrima (G. B. Sowerby I, 1834); Drillia (Crassispira) rugifera (Sowerby I, 1834); Pleurotoma rugifera Sowerby I, 1834 (basionym)

= Kylix rugifera =

Species of gastropod

Kylix rugifera is a species of sea snail, a marine gastropod mollusk in the family Drilliidae.

== Description ==
The shell has a very dark chocolate color. The whorls are longitudinally ribbed with the ribs terminating on a nodulous periphery, above which the surface is smooth and slightly concave. The lower portion of the body whorl has revolving striae. The shell reaches a length of 22 mm.

== Distribution ==
This species occurs in the demersal zone of the Pacific Ocean off the Galapagos Islands and Panama.
