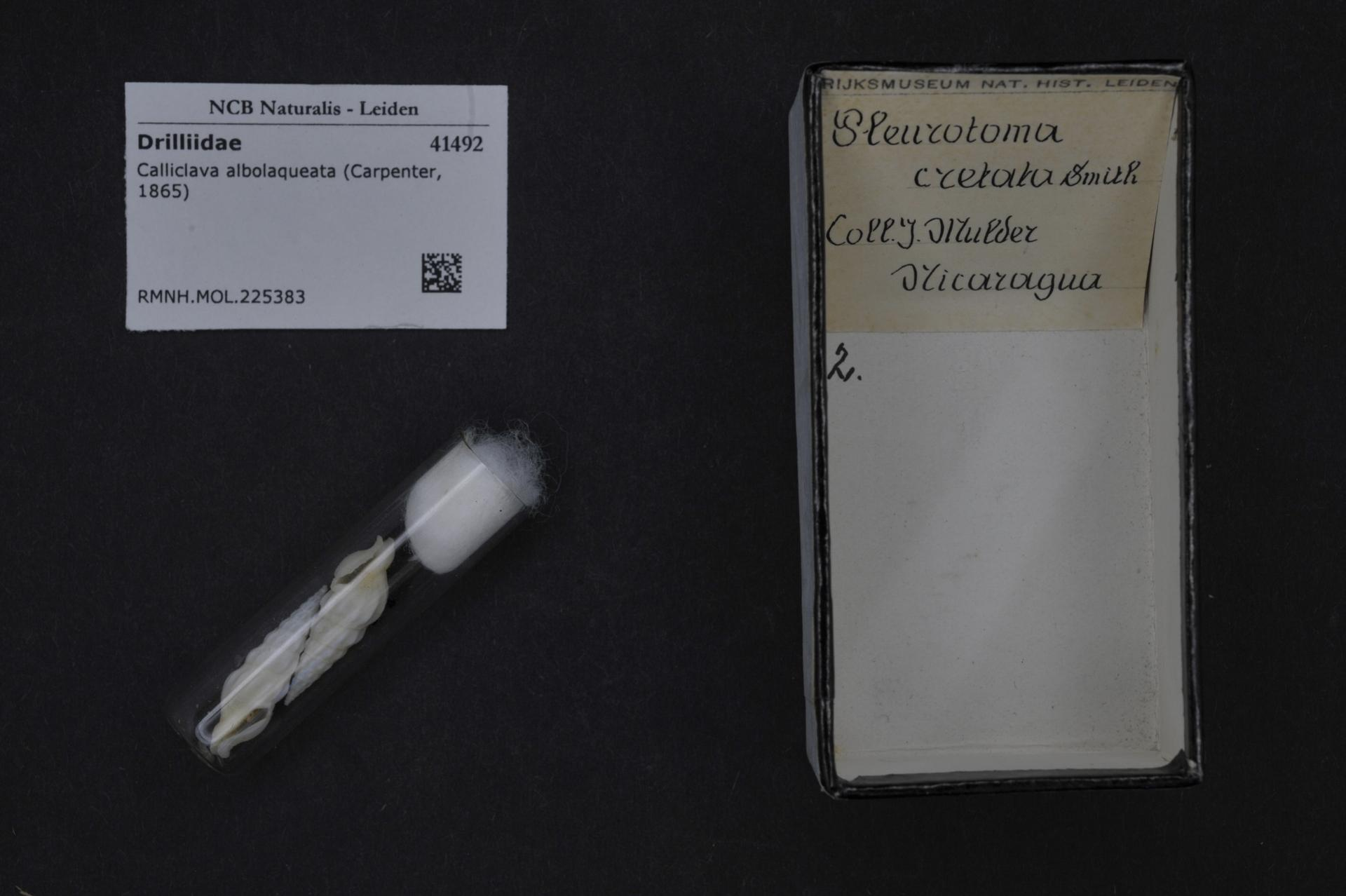
- Calliclava albolaqueata (Carpenter, 1865)

Scientific classification
- Kingdom: Animalia
- Phylum: Mollusca
- Class: Gastropoda
- Subclass: Caenogastropoda
- Order: Neogastropoda
- Superfamily: Conoidea
- Family: Drilliidae
- Genus: Calliclava
- Species: C. albolaqueata

Binomial name
- Calliclava albolaqueata (Carpenter, 1865)

Synonyms
- Clavus cretatus Smith, E.A., 1888; Mangelia albolaqueata Carpenter, 1865; Mangilia albolaqueata Carpenter, 1865

= Calliclava albolaqueata =

Species of gastropod

Calliclava albolaqueata is a species of sea snail, a marine gastropod mollusk in the family Drilliidae.

== Description ==
The size of an adult shell varies between 20 mm and 24 mm. The shell has an ivory-white colour, and has ribs in slanting rows.

== Distribution ==
This species occurs in the Pacific Ocean between Mexico and Nicaragua.
