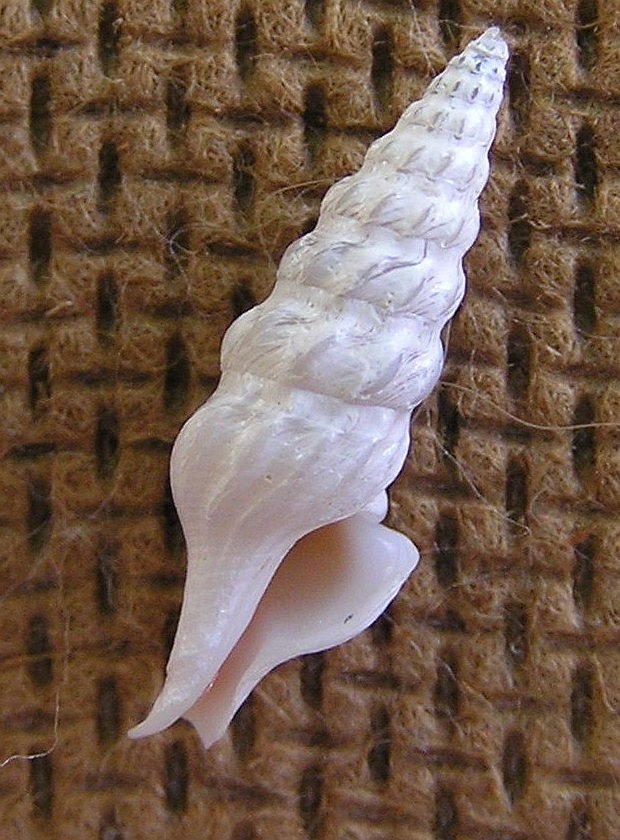
- Apertural view of a shell of Agladrillia pudica

Scientific classification
- Kingdom: Animalia
- Phylum: Mollusca
- Class: Gastropoda
- Subclass: Caenogastropoda
- Order: Neogastropoda
- Superfamily: Conoidea
- Family: Drilliidae
- Genus: Agladrillia
- Species: A. pudica

Binomial name
- Agladrillia pudica (Hinds, 1843)
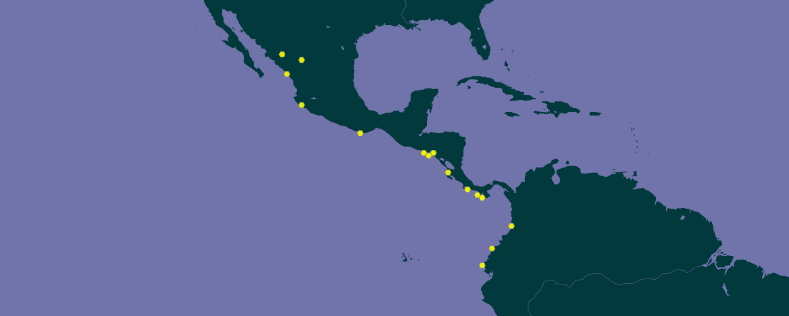

Synonyms
- Clavatula pudica Hinds, 1843; Drillia pudica Hinds, 1843

= Agladrillia pudica =

Species of gastropod

Agladrillia pudica is a species of sea snail, a marine gastropod mollusk in the family Drilliidae.

== Description ==
The size of an adult shell varies between 13 mm and 20 mm.

The whorls are short and are characterized by oblique ribs that become obsolete on the back of the body whorl and are depressed below the sutures. The shell's color is a yellowish brown, accented by a deep reddish chestnut spot on the back of the body whorl. Additionally, the siphonal canal is relatively long compared to other species in this genus.

== Distribution ==
This species occurs in the Pacific Ocean off Central America and Ecuador.
