= Calliclava subtilis =

Scientific classification
- Kingdom: Animalia
- Phylum: Mollusca
- Class: Gastropoda
- Subclass: Caenogastropoda
- Order: Neogastropoda
- Superfamily: Conoidea
- Family: Drilliidae
- Genus: Calliclava
- Species: C. subtilis

Binomial name
- Calliclava subtilis McLean & Poorman, 1971

Species of gastropod

Calliclava subtilis is a species of sea snail, a marine gastropod mollusk in the family Drilliidae. This species' name means 'fine' or 'precise'.

== Description ==
The pink-tinted white shell grows to a length of around 10-16 mm, displaying ten whorls. The anterior canal is short but deeply notched.

== Distribution ==
This species occurs in the Pacific Ocean along Panama.
