= Calliclava jaliscoensis =

Scientific classification
- Kingdom: Animalia
- Phylum: Mollusca
- Class: Gastropoda
- Subclass: Caenogastropoda
- Order: Neogastropoda
- Superfamily: Conoidea
- Family: Drilliidae
- Genus: Calliclava
- Species: C. jaliscoensis

Binomial name
- Calliclava jaliscoensis McLean & Poorman, 1971

Species of gastropod

Calliclava jaliscoensis is a species of sea snail, a marine gastropod mollusk in the family Drilliidae.

== Description ==
The length of the shell attains 10 mm.

== Distribution ==
This species occurs in the Pacific Ocean along the Galápagos Islands and from Mexico to Panama.
