= Elaeocyma ricaudae =

Scientific classification
- Kingdom: Animalia
- Phylum: Mollusca
- Class: Gastropoda
- Subclass: Caenogastropoda
- Order: Neogastropoda
- Superfamily: Conoidea
- Family: Drilliidae
- Genus: Elaeocyma
- Species: E. ricaudae

Binomial name
- Elaeocyma ricaudae Berry, 1969

Synonyms
- Cymatosyrinx (Elaeocyma) ricaudae Abbott, 1974

Species of gastropod

Elaeocyma ricaudae is a species of sea snails, a marine gastropod mollusc in the family Drilliidae.

== Distribution ==
This species occurs in the demersal zone of the Pacific Ocean from Baja California to Panama.
