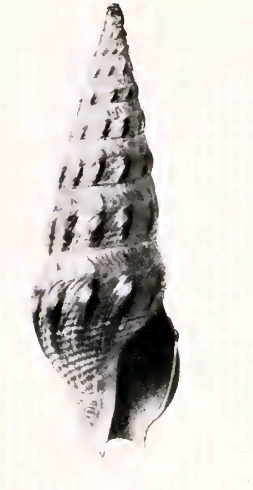
- Original image of a shell of Elaeocyma empyrosia

Scientific classification
- Kingdom: Animalia
- Phylum: Mollusca
- Class: Gastropoda
- Subclass: Caenogastropoda
- Order: Neogastropoda
- Superfamily: Conoidea
- Family: Drilliidae
- Genus: Elaeocyma
- Species: E. empyrosia

Binomial name
- Elaeocyma empyrosia (Dall, 1899)

Synonyms
- Clavus (Cymatosyrinx) pallida (G. B. Sowerby I, 1834); Clavus (Elaeocyma) empyrosia Wenz, 1943; Cymatosyrinx (Elaeocyma) empyrosia Dall, 1921; Drillia empyrosia Dall, 1899 (basionym)

= Elaeocyma empyrosia =

Species of gastropod

Elaeocyma empyrosia is a species of sea snail, a marine gastropod mollusk in the family Drilliidae.

== Description ==
The shell grows to a length of 31 mm.

(Original description) The solid shell has a high acute spire and a polished surface. Its color is yellowish with a burnt sienna brown tint on the later whorls. A paler peripheral band develops white patches where it crosses the ribs. The transverse sculpture consists of (about 11) slightly oblique somewhat flexuous ribs, obsolete below the periphery and upon the anal fasciole, the sharpest on the earlier whorls. The spiral sculpture consists of coarse, sometimes nearly obsolete threads, most obvious below the periphery. The shell contains 9 whorls (the nucleus lost in the specimen). The aperture is short, wide, with a deep wide notch leaving a wide fasciole, a callous lump above the notch on the body, and a rather strong whitish callus, externally brown-edged, on the columella. The siphonal notch is wide with a marked fasciole. The siphonal canal is slightly recurved.

== Distribution ==
This species occurs in the Eastern Pacific Ocean off California.
