= Kylix zacae =

Scientific classification
- Kingdom: Animalia
- Phylum: Mollusca
- Class: Gastropoda
- Subclass: Caenogastropoda
- Order: Neogastropoda
- Superfamily: Conoidea
- Family: Drilliidae
- Genus: Kylix
- Species: K. zacae

Binomial name
- Kylix zacae Hertlein & Strong, 1951

Synonyms
- Clavus zacae (Hertlein & Strong, 1951)

Species of gastropod

Kylix zacae is a species of sea snail, a marine gastropod mollusk in the family Drilliidae. It is part of the demersal fauna, primarily found in the Pacific Ocean.

== Description ==
The shell of Kylix zacae grows to a length of approximately 15 mm. The shell is elongated with a narrow aperture and distinct axial ribs, characteristic of the family Drilliidae. The color ranges from pale to dark brown, with some specimens displaying subtle patterns on the surface. The species lacks a trochophore larval stage, which is present in many other gastropods, and instead undergoes direct development.

== Distribution ==
Kylix zacae occurs in the demersal zone of the Pacific Ocean, specifically off Santa Inez Bay in the Gulf of California, Western Mexico. It inhabits sandy and muddy substrates at depths of approximately 20–50 meters.

== Ecology and Behavior ==
Kylix zacae is a predatory species that feeds on smaller invertebrates in its habitat. It is a non-broadcast spawner, meaning that fertilization occurs internally, and the eggs are laid directly onto the substrate. The lack of a free-swimming larval stage reduces its dispersal capability, limiting its geographical range.
