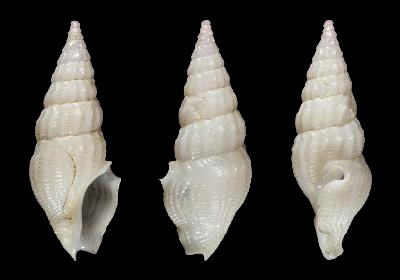
- Shells of Calliclava vigorata (specimen at MNHN, Paris)

Scientific classification
- Kingdom: Animalia
- Phylum: Mollusca
- Class: Gastropoda
- Subclass: Caenogastropoda
- Order: Neogastropoda
- Superfamily: Conoidea
- Family: Drilliidae
- Genus: Calliclava
- Species: C. vigorata

Binomial name
- Calliclava vigorata Fallon, 2016

= Calliclava vigorata =

Species of gastropod

Calliclava vigorata is a species of sea snail, a marine gastropod mollusc in the family Drilliidae.

== Description ==
The length of the shell varies between 10 mm and 18 mm.

== Distribution ==
This marine species occurs off Venezuela, French Guiana, Suriname, and Brazil.
