= Elaeocyma melichroa =

Scientific classification
- Kingdom: Animalia
- Phylum: Mollusca
- Class: Gastropoda
- Subclass: Caenogastropoda
- Order: Neogastropoda
- Superfamily: Conoidea
- Family: Drilliidae
- Genus: Elaeocyma
- Species: E. melichroa

Binomial name
- Elaeocyma melichroa McLean & Poorman, 1971

Species of gastropod

Elaeocyma melichroa is a species of sea snail, a marine gastropod mollusk in the family Drilliidae.

== Description ==
The shell of Elaeocyma melichroa is elongated and turriculate. Its coloration ranges from pale to dark shades. The shell features pronounced axial ribs and spiral striations. The aperture is narrow, and the siphonal canal is slightly recurved. The average shell length ranges between 10 mm and 19 mm.

== Distribution ==
This species occurs in the demersal zone of the Pacific Ocean off the Galapagos Islands.
