= Lioglyphostoma woodringi =

Scientific classification
- Kingdom: Animalia
- Phylum: Mollusca
- Class: Gastropoda
- Subclass: Caenogastropoda
- Order: Neogastropoda
- Superfamily: Conoidea
- Family: Pseudomelatomidae
- Genus: Lioglyphostoma
- Species: L. woodringi

Binomial name
- Lioglyphostoma woodringi Fargo, 1953

Species of gastropod

Lioglyphostoma woodringi is a species of sea snail, a marine gastropod mollusk in the family Pseudomelatomidae, the turrids and allies. The species is named in honor of Wendell P. Woodring.

== Description ==
The length of the shell attains 9 mm.

== Distribution ==
This marine species occurs off Louisiana, United States.
