= Elaeocyma drilliaeformis =

Scientific classification
- Kingdom: Animalia
- Phylum: Mollusca
- Class: Gastropoda
- Subclass: Caenogastropoda
- Order: Neogastropoda
- Superfamily: Conoidea
- Family: Drilliidae
- Genus: Elaeocyma
- Species: E. drilliaeformis

Binomial name
- Elaeocyma drilliaeformis (Cossmann & Pissarro, 1901)

Extinct species of gastropod

Elaeocyma drilliaeformis is an extinct species of sea snail, a marine gastropod mollusk in the family Drilliidae.

== Distribution ==
This extinct species was found in strata of the Lutetian in France.
