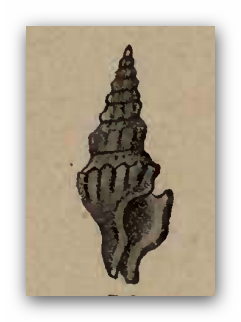
- Drawing of a shell of Kylix impressa

Scientific classification
- Kingdom: Animalia
- Phylum: Mollusca
- Class: Gastropoda
- Subclass: Caenogastropoda
- Order: Neogastropoda
- Superfamily: Conoidea
- Family: Drilliidae
- Genus: Kylix
- Species: K. impressa

Binomial name
- Kylix impressa (Hinds, 1843)

Synonyms
- Clavatula impressa Hinds, 1843 (basionym); Drillia impressa (Hinds, 1843); Drillia (Clavus) impressa (Hinds, 1843); Elaeocyma impressa Hinds, 1843; Pleurotoma impressa (Hinds, 1843)

= Kylix impressa =

Species of gastropod

Kylix impressa is a species of sea snail, a marine gastropod mollusk in the family Drilliidae.

== Description ==
The shell grows to a length of 14 mm. The shell is tuberculately ribbed with oblique ribs. The interstices are transversely striated The back of the body whorl is smooth. The shell has a pale flesh-color, the ribs are whitish. The outer lip is a little expanded.

== Distribution ==
This species occurs in the demersal zone of the Pacific Ocean from Nicaragua to Costa Rica.
