= Calliclava alcmene =

Scientific classification
- Kingdom: Animalia
- Phylum: Mollusca
- Class: Gastropoda
- Subclass: Caenogastropoda
- Order: Neogastropoda
- Superfamily: Conoidea
- Family: Drilliidae
- Genus: Calliclava
- Species: C. alcmene

Binomial name
- Calliclava alcmene (Dall, 1919)

Synonyms
- Clathrodrillia (Kylix) alcmene Dall, 1919; Kylix alcmene Dall, 1919; Kylix turveri Hertlein, L.G. & A.M. Strong, 1951

Species of gastropod

Calliclava alcmene is a species of sea snail, a marine gastropod mollusk in the family Drilliidae.

== Description ==
The size of an adult shell varies between 13.5 mm and 19 mm.

(Original description) The small shell is pinkish white and polished. It is acute, with a flat-topped protoconch of two polished, prominently peripherally keeled whorls and about eight subsequent whorls. The suture is appressed, with a retractively nodulous, thickened band in front of it, forming the posterior margin of the anal fasciole. The sculpture consists of (on the body whorl 22) somewhat sigmoid rounded ribs with subequal interspaces, reaching from the suture over the whorl to the siphonal canal. They are constricted over the narrow anal fasciole and feebler on the anterior part of the body whorl. These ribs are cut into subnodulous segments by deep narrow sharp spiral grooves, with much wider interspaces, two or three on the spire, nine or ten between the fasciole and the siphonal canal on the body whorl. On the canal are five or six coarse close-set threads. The aperture of the holotype (probably not quite mature) is rather narrow. The anal sulcus is narrow, not deep. The outer lip is thin, sharp, prominently arcuate. The inner lip is erased. The columella is short and twisted. The short siphonal canal is hardly differentiated.

== Distribution ==
This species occurs in the Gulf of California, Western Mexico.
