= Ianthe Thomas =

Black children's American author

Ianthe Thomas, also known as Ianthe Mac Thomas (1951–2002), was an African-American children's author, journalist, and curriculum developer. She wrote six children's books between 1973 and 1981 that positively portrayed black children. She was also involved in social justice movements until her death in 2002.

== Life ==
She was born in New York City in 1951 and spent her childhood in Hyde Park, New York. She attended Sarah Lawrence College and then the Universidad de Coimbra to study sculpture. She had an art show showcasing her steel and iron pieces. She worked as a curriculum developer in Cambridge, Massachusetts. She lived with her husband in New York City in the mid-1970s. In the 1980s, she worked as an op-ed journalist for The Daily News. She also wrote pieces about "the 'hood and its tragedies" for the Village Voice.

=== Career ===
Thomas's children's books are "noted for their use of Black speech patterns and focus on personal relationships.". They encouraged children to care about others and is listed in several sources as quality examples of multicultural literature for use in classrooms. Her book Hi, Mrs. Mallory! was recognized by the National Counsel of Social Students as one of the NCSS/CBC Notable Social Studies Trade Book for Young People as one that helped children to understand themselves in relation to others who are aging. My Street's a Morning Cool Street is an illustrated children's poetry book that was reviewed in The Reading Teacher which noted that it "is written about black children,... [is] concerned with personal pride,... [and it] ends happily." The article also noted its use of literary methods, imagery, and the ability of teachers to use it as a springboard for students to also describe what they see around them

In the mid-1970s, Thomas's titles appeared in the Interracial Books for Children Bulletin (IBCB), a publication that was created to review children's books with African American themes in light of social justice for minorities. She also reviewed for the publication, pointing out harmful stereotypes including illustrations that "demean Black people" and "inauthentic renderings of southern Black speech".

Hi, Mrs. Mallory! was a classroom and school library book that encouraged children to have positive relationships with adults. It crossed age and race barriers while addressing loss (death) of a friend in a way children could understand. In 1979, The Reading Teacher review called it a "touching story of a little girl and an unconventional older woman". Elementary English reviewed Lordy, Aunt Hattie in 1984 stating "The text and full color pictures create warm, affectionate images of the joy of summertime in the rural South".

In 1986, she appears along with the title and description of Eliza's Daddy and Walk Home Tired, Billy Jenkins are listed in three sections that "generate high self-esteem and positive self-concept in Black children", Beyond the Stereotypes: A Guide to Resources for Black Girls and Young Women. Eliza's Daddy is also listed as a book to "help children cope effectively with stressful situations"

Thomas also wrote editorial articles for The Daily News and the Village Voice in the mid-1980s that described life in The Bronx. Screenwriter Charles Rosin credits Ianthe Thomas's article from the Village Voice about Jackie Watson, a New York street urchin who sold drugs on the streets to survive as the reason he wrote the screen play Child Saver. Her article "Archivist of the South Bronx" helped to showcase the work of Martine Barrat who filmed the lives of everyday people living in The Bronx, New York.

Her work as an author also influenced the work of Toni Cade Bambara who said that Ianthe Thomas was one of the authors who gave her "the courage to go on with my bad self."

=== Death ===
She died in 2002. Her boyfriend was arrested for her murder and later admitted to killing her, claiming that it was assisted suicide.

== Awards ==
In 1980, her book Hi, Mrs. Mallory! made the Notable Social Studies Tradebooks for Young People list (also called the National Council for Social Studies Notable Children's Book Award).

== Works ==
=== Books ===
Sources:

- Lordy, Aunt Hattie (Harper & Row,1973)
- Walk home tired, Billy Jenkins. (Harper & Row, 1974)
- Eliza's daddy. (Harcourt Brace Jovanovich, 1976)
- My Street's a Morning Cool Street (Harper & Row, 1976)
- Hi, Mrs. Mallory! (Harper & Row, 1979)
- Willie Blows a Mean Horn (Harper & Row, 1981)

=== Articles ===
- "Archivist from the Bronx" (La Revue, October 2, 1978)
- "We Don't Take Nothing from Nobody" (The Akron Beacon Journal; Wednesday, February 28, 1979)
