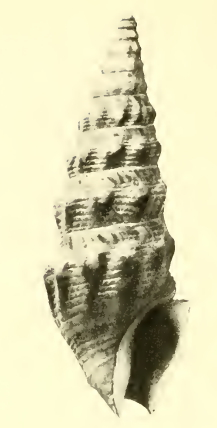
- Original image of a shell of Calliclava aegina

Scientific classification
- Kingdom: Animalia
- Phylum: Mollusca
- Class: Gastropoda
- Subclass: Caenogastropoda
- Order: Neogastropoda
- Superfamily: Conoidea
- Family: Drilliidae
- Genus: Calliclava
- Species: C. aegina

Binomial name
- Calliclava aegina (Dall, 1919)

Synonyms
- Elaeocyma aegina Dall, 1919

= Calliclava aegina =

Species of gastropod

Calliclava aegina is a species of sea snail, a marine gastropod mollusk in the family Drilliidae.

== Description ==
The length of the shell attains 13 mm, its diameter 4.8 mm.

(Original description) The brownish shell is pale on the early whorls, with a whitish glaze and polished. The shell is acute, except for the apex of the protoconch, which is flattened. The protoconch is smooth and polished. It contains two whorls, the second sharply keeled and passing gradually into the sculpture of the subsequent 8½ whorls. The suture is strongly appressed behind the concave arcuately striated anal fasciole. The axial sculpture shows (on the body whorl 10) prominent protractive ribs extending from the fasciole to the succeeding suture on the spire and somewhat over the periphery on the body whorl. These ribs are knob-like and prominent on the periphery and rapidly diminish forward. The incremental sculpture is faint. The spiral sculpture begins on the early whorls with about four faint striae which grow sharper on the later whorls which carry four or five grooves with wider flattish interspaces between the periphery and the succeeding suture, with on the later whorls sometimes one or two on the anal fasciole. On the body whorl there are 16 or more in all. The last rib on the body whorl is more swollen than the others and usually darker in color. The aperture is narrow. The outer lip is thin, sharp, produced, smooth internally with a deep rounded anal sulcus close to the suture with a heavy lump of callus on the side of the body. The inner lip has a rather thick callus with a raised edge extending to the end of the columella. The siphonal canal is short, wide, deeply cut, with a small keel bordering the posterior edge of the siphonal fasciole. The operculum is dark brown.

== Distribution ==
This marine species was found off Agua Verde Bay, Gulf of California, Western Mexico.
