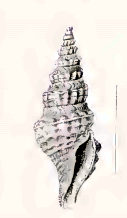
- Original image of a shell of Drillia sesquitertia

Scientific classification
- Kingdom: Animalia
- Phylum: Mollusca
- Class: Gastropoda
- Subclass: Caenogastropoda
- Order: Neogastropoda
- Superfamily: Conoidea
- Family: Drilliidae
- Genus: Drillia
- Species: D. sesquitertia

Binomial name
- Drillia sesquitertia Martens, E.C. von, 1904

= Drillia sesquitertia =

Species of gastropod

Drillia sesquitertia is a species of sea snail, a marine gastropod mollusk in the family Drilliidae.

This is a taxon inquirendum.

== Description ==
The length of the shell attains 21 mm, its diameter 7 mm.

(Original description in Latin) The shell is biconical and turreted, solid, whitish, and uniform in color. It is sculpted with two spiral, tubercle-bearing ridges on the penultimate and upper portion of the body whorl, which are separated by a double groove.

There are 9 whorls that increase regularly in size; they are somewhat flattened above and smooth except for the lines of growth. The suture is appressed. Beginning from the fourth whorl, the surface is sculpted with two rows of tubercles, with ten tubercles on the penultimate whorl and twelve on the body whorl.

The lower part of the body whorl is sculpted with several spiral ridges (five, excluding the siphonal canal), the first two of which are slightly nodulous, and it tapers gradually into the canal. The aperture equals one-third of the total length of the shell and is quite narrow.

The outer margin features a wide, arched notch between the suture and the first row of tubercles, then runs forward in an arch; it is somewhat thick. The siphonal canal is short and wide open, sculpted on the back with 4 to 5 oblique spiral ridges. The columellar lip is nearly straight and swells slightly at the top, without a distinct boundary, while the apertural wall is slightly concave.

== Distribution ==
This species occurs in the demersal zone off Somalia, East Africa.
