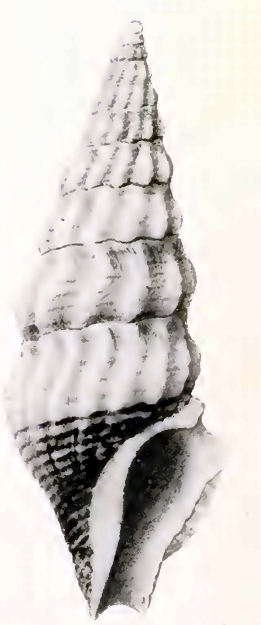
- original image of a shell of Kylix ianthe

Scientific classification
- Kingdom: Animalia
- Phylum: Mollusca
- Class: Gastropoda
- Subclass: Caenogastropoda
- Order: Neogastropoda
- Superfamily: Conoidea
- Family: Drilliidae
- Genus: Kylix
- Species: K. ianthe

Binomial name
- Kylix ianthe (Dall, 1919)

Synonyms
- Clavus ianthe (Dall, 1919); Clavus (Elaeocyma) ianthe (Dall, 1919); Elaeocyma ianthe Dall, 1919 (basionym)

= Kylix ianthe =

Species of gastropod

Kylix ianthe is a species of sea snail, a marine gastropod mollusk in the family Drilliidae.

== Description ==
The shell grows to a length of 17 mm, its diameter 6.5 mm.

(Original description) The shell is acute and polished. its color is white with touches of brown on the anal fasciole and on the body whorl behind the varix. The protoconch is blunt. The first whorl is smooth, the second peripherally carinate. The eight subsequent whorls are moderately rounded. The suture is distinct, appressed and somewhat undulate. The anal fasciole is narrow and slightly constricted. The spiral sculpture consists of (on the penultimate whorl 3 or 4) incised lines in front of the periphery. The wider interspaces are raised and more or less rounded. On the body whorl there are 16 or more, extending to the siphonal canal. The incised lines have a more opaque appearance contrasting with the translucent white of the whorls. There is no fine spiral striation. The axial sculpture consists of (on the penultimate whorl about a dozen) strong, wide ribs less prominent on the fasciole and fading out on the base and the last half of the body whorl. The interspaces are equal or sometimes wider. The ribs are cut by the incised lines but are not nodulose. They are most prominent on the anterior half of the whorls of the spire and on the periphery of the body whorl. The aperture is narrow. The anal sulcus is deep and rounded, with a prominent subsutural callus. The outer lip is sharp-edged, with a moderate varix behind it, and is arcuately produced. The inner lip shows a rather thick layer of enamel. The siphonal canal is distinct, rather wide and somewhat recurved.

== Distribution ==
This species occurs in the demersal zone of the Pacific Ocean from the Gulf of California, Mexico to Panama
