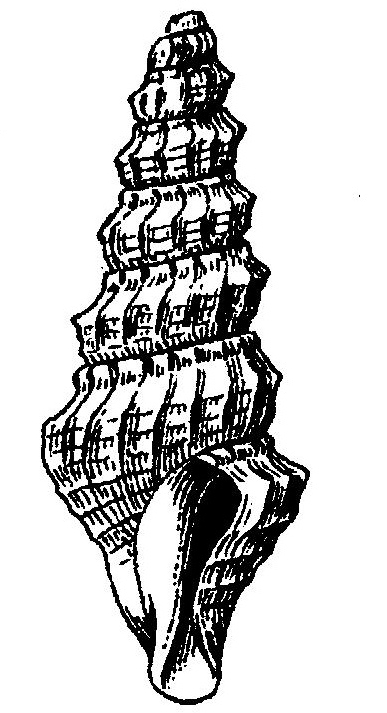
- Drawing of a shell of Drillia havanensis

Scientific classification
- Kingdom: Animalia
- Phylum: Mollusca
- Class: Gastropoda
- Subclass: Caenogastropoda
- Order: Neogastropoda
- Superfamily: Conoidea
- Family: Drilliidae
- Genus: Drillia
- Species: D. havanensis

Binomial name
- Drillia havanensis (Dall, 1881)

Synonyms
- Pleurotoma (Drillia) havanensis Dall, 1881

= Drillia havanensis =

Species of gastropod

Drillia havanensis is a species of sea snail, a marine gastropod mollusk in the family Drilliidae.

== Description ==
The shell grows to a length of 9 mm, its diameter 3 mm.

(Original description) The small, white shell is somewhat variable. The first six whorls are rather slender, giving a subcylindrical appearance. The latter whorls, if any, enlarge more rapidly. The shell contains about 8 whorls, of which about two are in the protoconch. These two are large, white, smooth, unsculptured, forming for the shell a rather blunt button-like apex. The succeeding whorls are marked by a transverse sculpture of twelve to (on the body whorl) eighteen narrow, oblique, flexuous ribs, which begin as little sharp nodules at the suture, are evanescent over the notch-band, thence continue to the next suture, or in the body whorl become evanescent at its anterior third. These ribs are crossed by a variable number of rather sharp revolving threads, with wider interspaces, usually three or four in number (on the older whorls) to sixteen (on the body whorl), beginning just in advance of the band. The first two are most prominent, and angulate the riblets where they cross them, producing little raised points. The succeeding threads are a little enlarged where they cross the ribs, but do not form points, and are as usual closer together on the anterior part of the siphonal canal. On the band is no sculpture except the lines of growth and an occasional faint indication of revolving striae. The number of riblets and of threads with their respective sharpness and the prominence of the nodules are somewhat variable. The band is somewhat excavated, tending to give a turreted appearance in old shells. The anal sulcus is broad, not deep. The thin outer lip is produced forward. The columella is straight, anteriorly attenuated, with very little callus. The lines of growth are well marked all over the shell.

== Distribution ==
This species occurs in the demersal zone of the Caribbean Sea (off Cuba) and the Gulf of Mexico (off the Yucatan Strait) at depths between 479 m and 1170 m.
