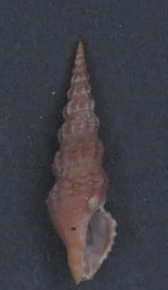
- Apertural view of a shell of Drillia concolor (museum specimen at Naturalis Biodiversity Center)

Scientific classification
- Kingdom: Animalia
- Phylum: Mollusca
- Class: Gastropoda
- Subclass: Caenogastropoda
- Order: Neogastropoda
- Superfamily: Conoidea
- Family: Drilliidae
- Genus: Drillia
- Species: D. concolor

Binomial name
- Drillia concolor (E.A. Smith, 1877)

Synonyms
- Pleurotoma (Drillia) concolor E.A. Smith, 1877

= Drillia concolor =

Species of gastropod

Drillia concolor is a species of sea snail, a marine gastropod mollusk in the family Drilliidae.

== Description ==
The length of the shell attains 43 mm, its diameter 11 mm.

The elongated shell is turreted and has a fusiform shape. This species is of uniform reddish or purplish brown. The upper half of the whorls is concave and devoid of spiral lirations, which exist only on the lower portion. The shell contains 13 whorls, of which the first two are convex. The rest are concave and angulate in the middle. The axial ribs cross the almost obsolete lirations. The aperture is narrow and measures about 1/3 of the total length of the shell. The outer lip is thin and has a crenulated margin and is smooth on the inside. On top, just below the suture, it is sharply indented. The columella is almost straight and has a thin callus. The siphonal canal is very small and slightly curved.

== Distribution ==
This marine species occurs off the Moluccas and off China.
