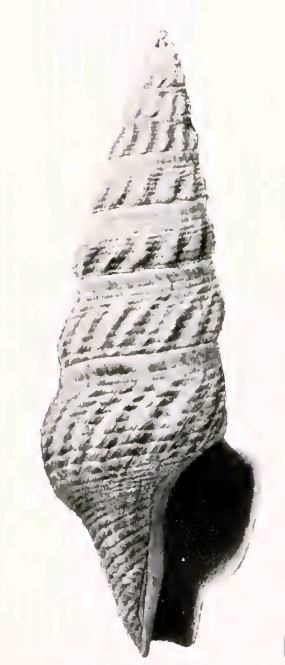
- Original image of a shell of Kylix halocydne

Scientific classification
- Kingdom: Animalia
- Phylum: Mollusca
- Class: Gastropoda
- Subclass: Caenogastropoda
- Order: Neogastropoda
- Superfamily: Conoidea
- Family: Drilliidae
- Genus: Kylix
- Species: K. halocydne

Binomial name
- Kylix halocydne (Dall, 1919)

Synonyms
- Cymatosyrinx halocydne (Dall, 1919); Cymatosyrinx (Elaeocyma) halocydne (Dall, 1919); Elaeocyma halocydne Dall, 1919 (basionym)

= Kylix halocydne =

Species of gastropod

Kylix halocydne is a species of sea snail, a marine gastropod mollusk in the family Drilliidae that lives in a tropical climate, usually in the Eastern Pacific area.

== Description ==
The shell grows to a length of 18 mm, its diameter 6 mm.

(Original description) The slender shell is acute and rather flat-sided. Its color is purplish brown usually more or less obscured by a yellowish white glaze. The first turn of the protoconch is smooth and inflated, the second has a peripheral keel and is followed by about 8½ subsequent whorls. The suture is strongly appressed with a smooth narrow band in front of it and behind the somewhat constricted fasciole Other spiral sculpture consists of sharply incised lines, four or five on the spire between the sutures, equal and with wider equal rounded interspaces, and about 24 on the body whorl. The interspaces become more cord-like near the siphonal canal and sometimes feebly nodulous where the lines cut the ribs. The axial sculpture consists of (on the penultimate whorl about 18) feeble narrow ribs, stronger near the apex, obsolete on the body whorl, with wider interspaces, beginning in front of the fasciole, hardly reaching the base, and protractively oblique. There are also fine sharp incremental lines, chiefly evident in the depressions, but here and there finely reticulating the interspaces. The aperture is rather wide. The rounded anal sulcus is conspicuous. The outer lip is thin, prominently arcuate and smooth within. The inner lip shows a thin layer of brownish enamel, the edge raised anteriorly. The siphonal canal is distinct, slightly constricted, with a small concentrically striated siphonal fasciole.

== Distribution ==
This species occurs in the Pacific Ocean from Costa Rica to Panama.
