= Drillia spirostachys =

Scientific classification
- Kingdom: Animalia
- Phylum: Mollusca
- Class: Gastropoda
- Subclass: Caenogastropoda
- Order: Neogastropoda
- Superfamily: Conoidea
- Family: Drilliidae
- Genus: Drillia
- Species: D. spirostachys

Binomial name
- Drillia spirostachys Kilburn, 1988

Species of gastropod

Drillia spirostachys is a species of sea snail, a marine gastropod mollusk in the family Drilliidae.

== Distribution ==
This species occurs in the demersal zone of the Western Indian Ocean off South Africa (south of Durban)
