= Drillia worthingtoni =

Scientific classification
- Kingdom: Animalia
- Phylum: Mollusca
- Class: Gastropoda
- Subclass: Caenogastropoda
- Order: Neogastropoda
- Superfamily: Conoidea
- Family: Drilliidae
- Genus: Drillia
- Species: D. worthingtoni

Binomial name
- Drillia worthingtoni E.A. Smith., 1904

Species of gastropod

Drillia worthingtoni is a species of sea snail, a marine gastropod mollusc in the family Drilliidae.

This is a taxon inquirendum.

== Description ==
The length of the shell is 16 mm, its diameter 6 mm.

(Original description in Latin) This shell is briefly fusiform (spindle-shaped) and brownish-white. It features nine whorls: the two apical whorls are smooth and rounded, while the subsequent whorls are excavated superiorly and nodulosely ribbed inferiorly (with 8-10 ribs on the penultimate whorl). These lower sections are also very finely striated transversely.

The body whorl bears a conspicuous, rounded varix on its left side and lacks ribs between this varix and the outer lip. The aperture is small, and the outer is thin, broadly and somewhat deeply sinuous superiorly. The columella is relatively straight, covered by a thin callus that is slightly nodulose near the sinus on its upper part.

== Distribution ==
This marine species occurs off the Andaman Islands.
