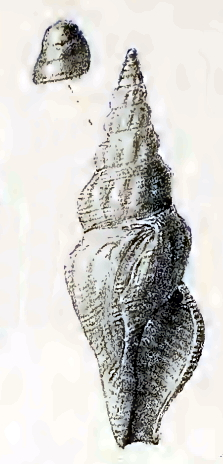

Scientific classification
- Kingdom: Animalia
- Phylum: Mollusca
- Class: Gastropoda
- Subclass: Caenogastropoda
- Order: Neogastropoda
- Superfamily: Conoidea
- Family: Drilliidae
- Genus: Agladrillia
- Species: A. macella

Binomial name
- Agladrillia macella (Melvill, 1923)

Synonyms
- Drillia macilenta (Melvill, 1923) (based on an invalid original name); Surcula macilenta Melvill, 1923, non Solander in Brander, 1766; Turris (Surcula) macella Melvill, 1923; Turris macella Melvill, 1923 superseded combination

= Agladrillia macella =

Species of gastropod

Agladrillia macella is a species of sea snail, a marine gastropod mollusk in the family Drilliidae.

== Description ==
The length of the shell attains 17.2 mm, its diameter 5 mm.

== Distribution ==
The holotype has been found off South Africa. The given type locality is unlikely as the holotype does not resemble anything known from the South African littoral. The referral to Agladrillia is speculative.
