= Wendell P. Woodring =

American paleontologist (1891–1983)

Wendell Phillips Woodring (13 June 1891, Reading, Pennsylvania – 29 January 1983, Santa Barbara, California) was an American paleontologist and geologist. He gained an international reputation for his research on invertebrate fossils of the Tertiary and in the stratigraphy of the Tertiary in California, Central America, and the Caribbean.

== Biography ==
Wendell P. Woodring's father, James Daniel Woodring, was a minister in the Evangelical Association and became the president of Albright College. (The college is named in honor of the Evangelical's Association's founder, Jacob Albright.) After James Daniel Woodring died in 1908, his widow raised their six children under difficult financial circumstances. Wendell P. Woodring graduated in 1910 at age 19 from Albright College and then taught high school science in St. James, Minnesota. Beginning in 1912 he studied geology at Johns Hopkins University and received his doctorate there in 1916. As a graduate student he was influenced by Charles Kephart Swartz (1861–1949) and Harry Fielding Reid. Woodring's doctoral dissertation, entitled The Mollusca of the Bowden Beds of Jamaica, is on marine bivalves and scaphopods of the Miocene from Jamaica. The two referees for the dissertation were William Bullock Clark and Edward W. Berry. While Woodring was a graduate student he also worked for the United States Geological Survey (USGS).

In 1917 Woodring worked for the Sinclair Consolidated Oil Corporation as a geologist and paleontologist in Costa Rica and Panama. In 1918 in Washington DC, he married Josephine Jamison (1889–1964). During WW I, he volunteered for the U.S. Army and served in France from 1918 to 1919 as a second lieutenant in an engineering regiment of the 29th Infantry Division. After his return to the United States, he worked for the USGS and became geologist-in-charge for the geological survey of Haiti from 1920 to 1922. After returning to the United States in April 1922, he was employed by the Tropical Oil Company to work as a paleontologist on Colombia's Caribbean coast. With the support of an informal agreement between the USGS and the Carnegie Institution of Washington, Woodring extended his dissertation research to gastropods with publication in 1925 under the title Miocene Mollusks from Bowden, Jamaica: Pelecypods and Scaphopods.

From 1927 to 1930 he spent three years as a professor of invertebrate paleontology at Caltech. There he became a close friend of Chester Stock, Ralph Daniel Reed (1889–1940), and Kenneth E. Lohman (who graduated from Caltech in 1929, was one of Woodring's undergraduate students, and became a leading expert on diatoms). In 1930 Woodring resigned from Caltech, because he greatly preferred field work to teaching.

In 1930 he returned to the USGS and from 1930 to 1932 mapped the Kettleman Hills (containing significant oil deposits). This mapping became the basis of his elucidation of the stratigraphy of the marine Tertiary in California. He also made important contributions to the history of the California Coast Range in the Cenozoic and the deformation along the San Andreas Fault. In the summer of 1934 he investigated, with Milton N. Bramlette, the Palos Verdes Hills near Los Angeles. One basic motivation was oil exploration, but Woodring and Bramlette's work became immediately important for engineering geologists because landslides were common there. Woodring's subsequent geological survey with Bramlette (from 1938 to 1940) of the Santa Maria area on the coast of southern California with later became important for petroleum geology. From 1941 to the end of WW II, Woodring was headquartered at UCLA during his work for the U.S. federal government as a petroleum geologist in California. After WW II ended, he went back to Washington D.C. at the USGS Headquarters in the Stratigraphy and Paleontology Division at the National Museum of Natural History. He retired from the USGS in 1961 but remained scientifically active.

From the late 1940s onwards Woodring was particularly concerned with the geology of the Canal Zone in Panama and surrounding areas and research into the geological history of the land bridge between North and South America. He also described the Tertiary mollusc fauna starting in the Eocene, as well as the regional stratigraphy. He concluded that the land bridge opened at the turn of the Pliocene and Pleistocene, and faunal exchange of mammals peaked in the early Pleistocene.

From 1950 to 1953 he organized a conference on biochemistry, paleoecology, and evolution. The conference was held from the 9th to the 11th of June 1953 in Shelter Island, New York. In honor of Woodring's contributions to science, Preston Cloud and Philip Abelson organized the Woodring Conference on Major Biologic Innovations and the Geologic Record. The Woodring Conference, attended by twenty-three scientists from various disciplines, was held from the 14th to the 16th of June 1961 at Big Meadows Lodge, Virginia.

Woodring was elected a Fellow of the American Association for the Advancement of Science in 1925. He was for the academic year 1948–1949 president of the Paleontological Society and for the academic year 1953–1954 president of the Geological Society of America. He was elected in 1946 a member of the National Academy of Sciences and in 1953 a member of the American Philosophical Society. He received in 1949 the Penrose Medal, in 1967 the Mary Clark Thompson Medal, and in 1977 the Paleontological Society Medal. In 1952 he was awarded an honorary doctorate by Albright College. Several Mollusca species have been named in his honor.

Wendell and Josephine Woodring had two daughters, Julia Worth Woodring (1920–2005) and Jane Hurst Woodring (1922–1954). In 1944 their elder daughter married Robert Milton Armagast (1914–2005), who became a professor of industrial arts at Adams State University in Colorado. Wendell P. Woodring, upon his death in 1983, was survived by his first daughter and three Armagast grandchildren. After his wife Josephine died in 1964, Wendell Woodring married in 1965 Merle Crisler Foshag, who died in 1977. She was known as a watercolorist and her first husband was William F. Foshag.

== Eponyms ==
- Conus woodringi
- Crassispira woodringi
- Kylix woodringi
- Lioglyphostoma woodringi
- Syntomodrillia woodringi
- Vokesimurex woodringi

== Selected publications ==
=== Articles ===
- How fossils got into rocks. The Scientific Monthly 23, 1926, pp. 337–345, published by the American Association for the Advancement of Science
- American Tertiary Molluscs of the genus Clementia, Shorter Contributions to General Geology, USGS, 1926, pp. 25– 47 abstract doi:10.3133/pp147C
- with M. N. Bramlette, Robert M. Kleinpell: Miocene stratigraphy and paleontology of Palos Verdes Hills, California. Am. Assoc. Pet. Geol. Bull. 20, 1936, pp. 125–159
- with S. N. Daviess: Geology and manganese deposits of Guisa-Los Negros area, Oriente province, Cuba. Geological Investigations in the American Republics, 1941-43, United States Government Printing Office, 1944, pp. 357–386
- Caribbean land and sea through the ages, Geolog. Soc. America Bulletin 65, 1954, pp. 719–732
  - Caribbean land and sea through the ages, in Preston Cloud (ed.), Adventures in Earth History, Freeman 1970, pp. 603–616 (reprint of 1954 article collected in "a volume of significant writings from original sources")
- The Panama land bridge as a sea barrier, American Philosophical Society Proc., 110, 1966, pp. 425–433

=== Books and monographs ===
- Woodring, Wendell Phillips; Brown, John S.; Burbank, Wilbur S. (1924). Geology of the Republic of Haiti. Port-au-Prince: Service Géologique, Haiti.
- ——— (1925). Miocene Mollusks from Bowden, Jamaica: Pelecypods and Scaphopods. Carnegie Institution of Washington. ISBN 9780598360151.
- ——— (1928). Miocene Mollusks from Bowden, Jamaica: Part 2, Gastropods and Discussion of Results. Carnegie Institution of Washington. OCLC 1157125744.
- ———; Roundy, Paul Vere; Farnsworth, Howard R. (1932). Geology and Oil Resources of the Elk Hills, California: Including Naval Petroleum Reserve No.1. U.S. Government Printing Office.
- ———; Stewart, Ralph Bentley; Richards, Ralph Webster (1940). Geology of the Kettleman Hills Oil Field, California: Stratigraphy, Paleontology, and Structure.
- ———; Bramlette, Milton Nunn; Kew, William Stephen Webster (1946). Geology and Paleontology of Palos Verdes Hills, California.
- ———; Bramlette, Milton Nunn (1950). "Geology and Paleontology of the Santa Maria District, California" (PDF). USGS Report: 4. Bibcode:1950usgs.rept....4W. doi:10.3133/pp222.
- ——— (1957). Geology and Paleontology of Canal Zone and Adjoining Parts of Panama: Description of Tertiary Mollusks (Gastropods: Eulimidae, Marginellidae to Helminthoglyptidae) : A Contribution to the History of the Panama Land Bridge (PDF).
