= Drillia acapulcana =

Scientific classification
- Kingdom: Animalia
- Phylum: Mollusca
- Class: Gastropoda
- Subclass: Caenogastropoda
- Order: Neogastropoda
- Superfamily: Conoidea
- Family: Drilliidae
- Genus: Drillia
- Species: D. acapulcana

Binomial name
- Drillia acapulcana (Lowe, 1935)

Synonyms
- Clavus acapulcana DuShane & R. Poorman, 1967; Elaeocyma acapulcana Lowe, 1935

Species of gastropod

Drillia acapulcana is a species of sea snail, a marine gastropod mollusk in the family Drilliidae.

Originally named Elaeocyma acapulcana by H.N. Lowe in 1935, it was renamed Drillia acapulcana by Mclean in 1971.

== Description ==
The length of the shell attains 23 mm, its diameter 10 mm.

== Distribution ==
This species occurs in the demersal zone of the Eastern Pacific off Mexico.
