= Fasciole =

Feature of mollusk shell anatomy

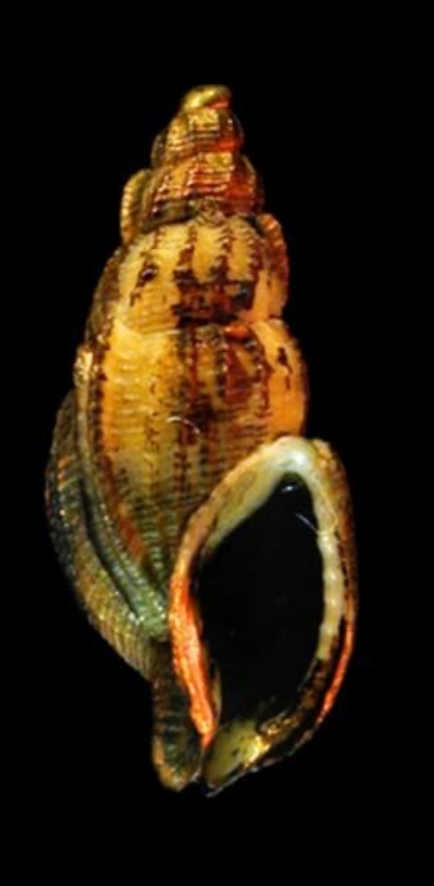
Shell of Africotriton carinapex, showing the fasciole (in white) around the aperture

A fasciole in mollusks refers to a band or ribbon-like structure that is often seen as a flattened, slightly depressed area on the shell, formed by the successive growth lines on the edges of a canal. It is typically found on the surface of the shell near the siphonal canal or around the aperture. The fasciole can play a role in the shell's overall structure and appearance. In some species, it might help in identifying the shell or understanding its functional morphology.

The term "anal fasciole" was proposed by W.H. Dall in 1885 to describe the raised ring or band that marks the track of the notch, a prominent feature in the sculpture of some gastropod shells. This structure is particularly notable in turban snails (family Turbinidae). The notch serves to allow waste matter to escape from the anus without contaminating the water flowing to the gills. The anal fasciole is often well-defined and can vary in size and prominence among different species.

The term "siphonal fasciole", named by Theodore Gill, bears a somewhat similar relation to the anterior end of the siphonal canal, but is generally less distinctly marked off from the rest of the surface.

The notch itself is a break or irregularity in the peristome, indicating the position of the siphon. The term "anal notch" is used to distinguish it from the "siphonal notch".
