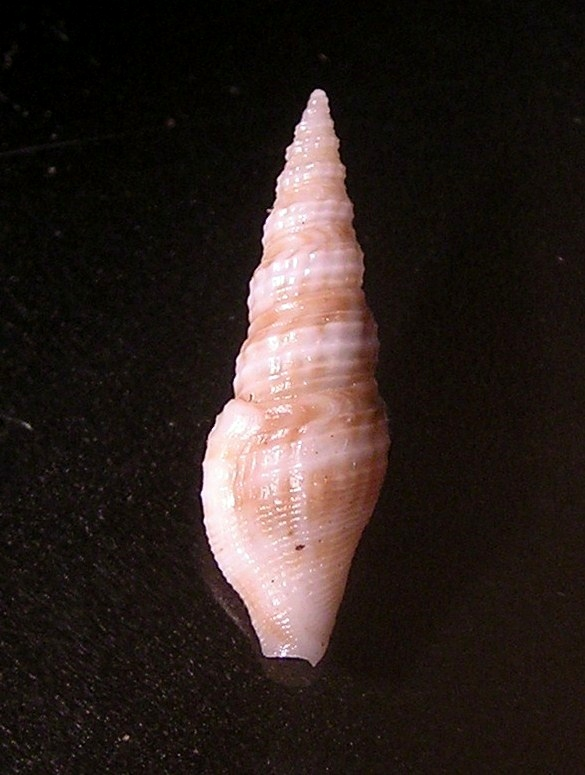
- Cymatosyrinx parciplicata

Scientific classification
- Kingdom: Animalia
- Phylum: Mollusca
- Class: Gastropoda
- Subclass: Caenogastropoda
- Order: Neogastropoda
- Superfamily: Conoidea
- Family: Drilliidae
- Genus: Cymatosyrinx; Dall, 1889

Type species
- † Cymatosyrinx lunata Lea, H.C., 1843

Species
- See text

Synonyms
- Drillia (Cymatosyrinx)

= Cymatosyrinx =

Genus of gastropods

Cymatosyrinx is a genus of sea snails, marine gastropod mollusks in the family Drilliidae.

The following species have also been found as fossils in the United States and/or in Mexico in the age range: 37.2 to 0.012 Ma: Cymatosyrinx aclinica Tucker and Wilson 1933 (alternative combination: Cymatosyrinx lunata aclinica), Cymatosyrinx dorseyi Cooke 1926, Cymatosyrinx limatula Conrad 1830 (synonyms: Drillia limatula, Pleurotoma limatula), Cymatosyrinx lunata Lea 1833, Cymatosyrinx magnoliana Olsson 1916, Cymatosyrinx mariana Petuch 1988, Cymatosyrinx perpolita Dall 1890, Cymatosyrinx tiara Gardner 1948, Cymatosyrinx ziczac Gardner 1948.

== Description ==
This genus includes the thin-shelled light-colored species, previously included in Drillia

The shell is generally short and stout, the spire often very short. The whorls contain nodulous axial ribs, extending over the whole of the volutions. They are generally without spiral sculpture, or, if present, very weak. The aperture is subrhomboidal, very little narrowed below, with a short and broad siphonal canal. The outer lip is arched, with a shallow sinus towards the suture. The inner lipis large and callous.

== Species ==
Species within the genus Cymatosyrinx include:

- Cymatosyrinx arbela Dall, 1919
- Cymatosyrinx carpenteri (Verrill & Smith, 1880)
- Cymatosyrinx fritillaria (Dall, 1927)
- Cymatosyrinx idothea Dall, 1919
- Cymatosyrinx impolita Kuroda, Habe & Oyama, 1971
- Cymatosyrinx johnsoni Arnold, 1903
- Cymatosyrinx nodulosa (Jeffreys, 1882)
- Cymatosyrinx parciplicata (Sowerby III, 1915)
- † Cymatosyrinx ziczac Gardner, 1948

Species brought into synonymy

- Cymatosyrinx allyniana Hertlein & Strong, 1951: synonym of Clathrodrillia allyniana (Hertlein & Strong, 1951)
- Cymatosyrinx arenensis Hertlein & Strong, 1951: synonym of Elaeocyma arenensis (Hertlein & Strong, 1951)
- Cymatosyrinx asaedai Hertlein & Strong, 1951: synonym of Imaclava asaedai (Hertlein & Strong, 1951)
- Cymatosyrinx bartschi Haas, 1941: synonym of Splendrillia bartschi (Haas, 1941)
- Cymatosyrinx centimata Dall, 1889: synonym of Spirotropis centimata (Dall, 1889)
- Cymatosyrinx ebur Dall, 1927: synonym of Lissodrillia ebur (Dall, 1927)
- Cymatosyrinx elissa Dall, 1919: synonym of Leptadrillia elissa Dall, 1919
- Cymatosyrinx ferminiana Dall, 1919: synonym of Globidrillia ferminiana Dall, 1919
- Cymatosyrinx fritillaria Dall, 1927: synonym of Ithycythara fritillaria (Dall, 1927)
- Cymatosyrinx hecuba Dall, 1919: synonym of Kylix hecuba Dall, 1919
- Cymatosyrinx hemphilli (Stearns, 1871): synonym of Globidrillia hemphillii (Stearns, 1871)
- Cymatosyrinx hotei Otuka, 1949: synonym of Imaclava hotei (Otuka, 1949)
- Cymatosyrinx lalage Dall, 1919: synonym of Splendrillia lalage Dall, 1919
- Cymatosyrinx pagodula Dall, 1889: synonym of Fenimorea pagodula (Dall, 1889)
- Cymatosyrinx palmeri Dall, 1919: synonym of Calliclava palmeri Dall, 1919
- Cymatosyrinx roseola Hertlein & Strong, 1955: synonym of Drillia roseola (Hertlein & Strong, 1955)
- Cymatosyrinx splendida Bartsch, 1934: synonym of Leptadrillia cookei (E. A. Smith, 1888)
- Cymatosyrinx strohbeeni Hertlein & Strong, 1951: synonym of Globidrillia strohbeeni (Hertlein & Strong, 1951)
- Cymatosyrinx thea Dall, 1884: synonym of Cerodrillia thea (Dall, 1884)
