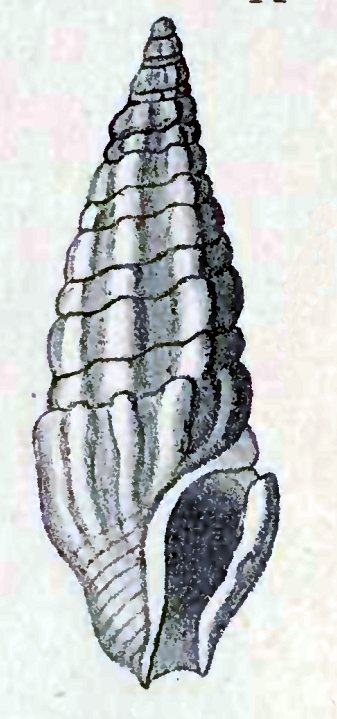
- Drawing of a shell of Splendrillia lucida

Scientific classification
- Kingdom: Animalia
- Phylum: Mollusca
- Class: Gastropoda
- Subclass: Caenogastropoda
- Order: Neogastropoda
- Superfamily: Conoidea
- Family: Drilliidae
- Genus: Splendrillia
- Species: S. lucida

Binomial name
- Splendrillia lucida (G. Nevill & H. Nevill, 1875)

Synonyms
- Drillia lucida Nevill & Nevill, 1875; Turris (Inquisitor) lucida (Nevill & Nevill, 1875)

= Splendrillia lucida =

Species of gastropod

Splendrillia lucida is a species of sea snail, a marine gastropod mollusk in the family Drilliidae.

== Description ==
The length of the shell attains 8 mm, its diameter 3 mm.

(Original description) The shell is acuminately fusiform, very smooth and glittering. It is white, slightly and irregularly marbled with pale brown here and there between the ribs and especially behind the outer lip. The suture is distinct. The protoconch is blunt and rounded, almost like that of Pyramidella in character. The shell contains 8 to 9 whorls. The two first are smooth and embryonal, the others divided with a deeply incised groove beneath the suture, longitudinally, thickly, distantly ribbed. The body whorl contains 9 ribs, transversely striated at its base, gibbous posteriorly, with a rather considerable smooth space behind the marginal varix. Next the suture the upper part of the ribs, cut off by the deep spiral groove, have the appearance of a row of granules. The columella and the aperture are smooth. There is a callous tubercle at the junction of outer lip with the former. The sinus is very deeply excavated.

The white shell is slightly and irregularly marbled with pale brown, between the ribs and especially behind the outer lip. It is allied in general to Leptadrillia quisqualis (Hinds, 1843), but it is but is smaller, with transverse striae at the base of the body whorl, with a row of granules and a deep groove beneath the suture, and with straight instead of oblique ribs.

== Distribution ==
This marine species occurs in the Persian Gulf and the Bay of Bengal and off the Andaman Islands.
