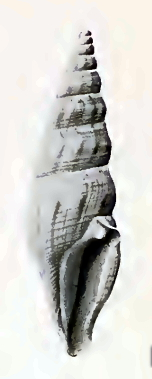
- Paracuneus immaculatus

Scientific classification
- Kingdom: Animalia
- Phylum: Mollusca
- Class: Gastropoda
- Subclass: Caenogastropoda
- Order: Neogastropoda
- Superfamily: Conoidea
- Family: Drilliidae
- Genus: Paracuneus; Laseron, 1954

Type species
- Mangelia immaculata Tenison-Woods, 1876

Species
- See text

= Paracuneus =

Genus of gastropods

Paracuneus is a genus of sea snails, marine gastropod mollusks in the family Drilliidae.

This genus is placed tentatively in the family Drilliidae.

== Species ==
Species within the genus Paracuneus include:

- Paracuneus immaculatus (Tenison-Woods, 1876)
- Paracuneus kemblensis Laseron, 1954

Species brought into synonymy

- Paracuneus cockae Kilburn, 1977: synonym of Inkinga cockae (Kilburn, 1977)
- Paracuneus platystoma (Smith E. A., 1877): synonym of Inkinga platystoma (E. A. Smith, 1877)
- Paracuneus spadix (Watson, 1886): synonym of Paracuneus immaculatus (Tenison-Woods, 1876)

== Distribution ==
The species in this marine genus are endemic to Australia and occur off New South Wales, Tasmania and Victoria.
