= Imaclava ima =

Scientific classification
- Kingdom: Animalia
- Phylum: Mollusca
- Class: Gastropoda
- Subclass: Caenogastropoda
- Order: Neogastropoda
- Superfamily: Conoidea
- Family: Drilliidae
- Genus: Imaclava
- Species: I. ima

Binomial name
- Imaclava ima Bartsch, 1944

Synonyms
- Drillia (Imaclava) ima (Barsch, 1944)

Species of gastropod

Imaclava ima, common name Ima's turrid, is a species of sea snail, a marine gastropod mollusk in the family Drilliidae.

McLean (1971) considered this species to be a synonym of Imaclava unimaculata (G. B. Sowerby I, 1834)

== Description ==
The shell grows to a length of 50 mm.

== Distribution ==
This species occurs in the Pacific Ocean off Baja California, Mexico.
