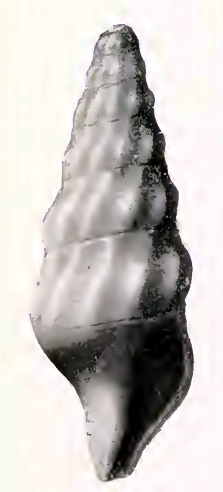
- Original image of a shell of Kylix hecuba

Scientific classification
- Kingdom: Animalia
- Phylum: Mollusca
- Class: Gastropoda
- Subclass: Caenogastropoda
- Order: Neogastropoda
- Superfamily: Conoidea
- Family: Drilliidae
- Genus: Kylix
- Species: K. hecuba

Binomial name
- Kylix hecuba (Dall, 1919)

Synonyms
- Clavus hecuba (Dall, 1919); Clavus (Cymatosyrinx) hecuba (Dall, 1919); Cymatosyrinx hecuba Dall, 1919 (basionym)

= Kylix hecuba =

Species of gastropod

Kylix hecuba is a species of sea snail, a marine gastropod mollusk in the family Drilliidae.

== Description ==
The shell grows to a length of 11 mm, its diameter 4.5 mm.

(Original description) The small, acute, rosaceous, solid shell contains six whorls, excluding the (damaged) protoconch. It differs from Cymatosyrinx idothea Dall, 1919 by its more slender shell, wider fasciole, over which the ends of the ribs reach the preceding suture, forming a more pronounced shoulder at the periphery, and having the whole shell spirally sculptured by small equal threads with subequal interspaces. The columella is longer and the siphonal canal distinct, longer, and somewhat constricted. Otherwise the shells are very similar and the protoconch, though damaged, appears to have been of the same character.

== Distribution ==
This species occurs in the demersal zone of the Pacific Ocean from the Gulf of California, Western Mexico to Panama
