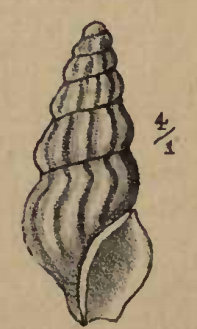
- Drawing of a shell of Cymatosyrinx carpenteri

Scientific classification
- Kingdom: Animalia
- Phylum: Mollusca
- Class: Gastropoda
- Subclass: Caenogastropoda
- Order: Neogastropoda
- Superfamily: Conoidea
- Family: Drilliidae
- Genus: Cymatosyrinx
- Species: C. carpenteri

Binomial name
- Cymatosyrinx carpenteri (Verrill & Smith, 1880)

Synonyms
- Daphnella carpenteri Verrill & Smith, 1880; Inodrillia carpenteri (Verrill & Smith in Verrill, 1880); Pleurotoma carpenteri Verrill & Smith, 1880

= Cymatosyrinx carpenteri =

Species of gastropod

Cymatosyrinx carpenteri is a species of sea snail, a marine gastropod mollusk in the family Drilliidae.

== Description ==
The shell is scarcely shouldered, with about twelve short flexuous longitudinal ribs and no spiral sculpture. The shell is white or pale yellow, often with darker brownish yellow ribs. The shell grows to a length of 7 mm.

(Original description) The rather small, pale brownish shell is solid and slender. Its surface is glossy. The shell contains 8 whorls, somewhat convex, crossed by about twelve strong, elevated, flexuous, smooth, rounded longitudinal ribs, which extend entirely across the upper whorls, and on the body whorl from the suture to the middle, below which the surface is smooth. The interstices between the ribs are deeply concave, wider than the ribs, and perfectly smooth, except the faint lines of growth. The outer lip shows a broad shallow notch, below the suture. The ovate aperture is rather small. The siphonal canal is short, narrow and straight. The columella is nearly straight.

== Distribution ==
This species occurs in the demersal zone of the tropical Western Atlantic Ocean.
