= Sedilia compacta =

Scientific classification
- Kingdom: Animalia
- Phylum: Mollusca
- Class: Gastropoda
- Subclass: Caenogastropoda
- Order: Neogastropoda
- Superfamily: Conoidea
- Family: Drilliidae
- Genus: Sedilia
- Species: S. compacta

Binomial name
- Sedilia compacta Faber, 2011

Species of gastropod

Sedilia compacta is a species of sea snail, a marine gastropod mollusk in the family Drilliidae.

== Distribution ==
This marine species occurs in the Caribbean Sea and is endemic to Belize.
