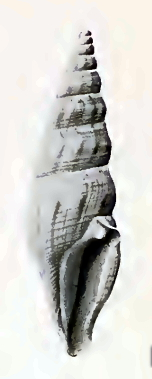
- Apertural view of a shell of Paracuneus immaculatus

Scientific classification
- Kingdom: Animalia
- Phylum: Mollusca
- Class: Gastropoda
- Subclass: Caenogastropoda
- Order: Neogastropoda
- Superfamily: Conoidea
- Family: Drilliidae
- Genus: Paracuneus
- Species: P. immaculatus

Binomial name
- Paracuneus immaculatus (Tenison-Woods, 1876)

Synonyms
- Drillia gabrieli Pritchard, G.B. & J.H. Gatliff, 1899; Drillia immaculatus (Tenison-Woods, 1876); Drillia immaculata Tate and May, 1901; Drillia spadix (Watson, 1886); Inquisitor immaculatus (Tenison-Woods, 1876); Inquisitor spadix (Watson, 1886); Mangelia immaculata Tenison-Woods, 1876 (basionym); Paracuneus spadix Watson, R.B., 1886; Paracuneus spadix tumulus Laseron, C.F., 1954; Pleurotoma (Drillia) spadix Watson, 1886

= Paracuneus immaculatus =

Species of gastropod

Paracuneus immaculatus is a species of sea snail, a marine gastropod mollusk in the family Drilliidae.

Subspecies

- Paracuneus immaculatus peronianus (Tenison-Woods, 1876), occurring in Quarantine Bay, New South Wales, Australia. .: synonym of Paracuneus immaculatus (Tenison-Woods, 1876)
- Paracuneus spadix tumulus (Watson, 1886) found at a depth of 125 m. off Twofold Bay, NSW, Australia. It has become a synonym of Paracuneus immaculatus (Tenison-Woods, 1876)

== Description ==
The shell grows to a length of 19 mm, its diameter 6 mm.

(Original description) The white and shining shell is fusiformly turreted. The spire is acute. The shell contains 9 sloping whorls. These are canaliculate at the sutures, angulate and obsoletely tuberculate above, and transversely obsoletely lirate. The aperture is oval. The outer lipis thin. The sinus is conspicuous. The lip is simple and tuberculate above.

== Distribution ==
This marine species is endemic to Australia and occurs in the demersal zone off New South Wales, Victoria and Tasmania, Australia.
