= Leptadrillia flavomaculata =

Scientific classification
- Kingdom: Animalia
- Phylum: Mollusca
- Class: Gastropoda
- Subclass: Caenogastropoda
- Order: Neogastropoda
- Superfamily: Conoidea
- Family: Drilliidae
- Genus: Leptadrillia
- Species: L. flavomaculata

Binomial name
- Leptadrillia flavomaculata Fallon, 2016

Species of gastropod

Leptadrillia flavomaculata is a species of sea snail, a marine gastropod mollusc in the family Drilliidae.

== Description ==
The length of the shell varies between 6 mm and 12.5 mm.

== Distribution ==
This marine species occurs off Curaçao, Netherlands Antilles.
