= Leptadrillia parkeri =

Scientific classification
- Kingdom: Animalia
- Phylum: Mollusca
- Class: Gastropoda
- Subclass: Caenogastropoda
- Order: Neogastropoda
- Superfamily: Conoidea
- Family: Drilliidae
- Genus: Leptadrillia
- Species: L. parkeri

Binomial name
- Leptadrillia parkeri Gabb W.M., 1873

Synonyms
- † Turris (Surcula) parkeri Gabb, 1873 (basionym); † Turris parkeri Gabb, 1873 (original combination); † Drillia parkeri (Gabb, 1873)

Extinct species of gastropod

Leptadrillia parkeri is an extinct species of sea snail, a marine gastropod mollusk in the family Drilliidae.

== Description ==
The length of the shell attains 22.3 mm, its diameter 6.1 mm.

== Distribution ==
This extinct marine species was found in Pliocene strata of Jamaica; age range: 3.6 to 2.588 Ma.
