= Leptadrillia firmichorda =

Scientific classification
- Kingdom: Animalia
- Phylum: Mollusca
- Class: Gastropoda
- Subclass: Caenogastropoda
- Order: Neogastropoda
- Superfamily: Conoidea
- Family: Drilliidae
- Genus: Leptadrillia
- Species: L. firmichorda

Binomial name
- Leptadrillia firmichorda McLean & Poorman, 1971

Species of gastropod

Leptadrillia firmichorda is a species of sea snail, a marine gastropod mollusk in the family Drilliidae.

== Description ==
The shell attains a length of 8.6 mm, its diameter 3.1 mm.

== Distribution ==
This species occurs in the demersal zone of the Eastern Pacific Ocean off the Galapagos Islands, Panama and Colombia.
