= Sedilia sedilia =

Scientific classification
- Kingdom: Animalia
- Phylum: Mollusca
- Class: Gastropoda
- Subclass: Caenogastropoda
- Order: Neogastropoda
- Superfamily: Conoidea
- Family: Drilliidae
- Genus: Sedilia
- Species: S. sedilia

Binomial name
- Sedilia sedilia (W. H. Dall, 1890)

Synonyms
- † Drillia sedilia Dall, 1890 (original combination)

Extinct species of gastropod

Sedilia sedilia is an extinct species of sea snail, a marine gastropod mollusk in the family Drilliidae.

== Distribution ==
This extinct marine species was found in Quaternary strata of Florida, and the Pliocene of North Carolina, US.
