= Paracuneus kemblensis =

Scientific classification
- Kingdom: Animalia
- Phylum: Mollusca
- Class: Gastropoda
- Subclass: Caenogastropoda
- Order: Neogastropoda
- Superfamily: Conoidea
- Family: Drilliidae
- Genus: Paracuneus
- Species: P. kemblensis

Binomial name
- Paracuneus kemblensis Laseron, 1954

Species of gastropod

Paracuneus kemblensis is a species of sea snail, a marine gastropod mollusk in the family Drilliidae.

The epithet "kemblensis" is derived from Port Kembla, New South Wales, Australia, where the species was first found.

== Distribution ==
This marine species is endemic to Australia and occurs in the demersal zone off New South Wales.
