= Leptadrillia profunda =

Scientific classification
- Kingdom: Animalia
- Phylum: Mollusca
- Class: Gastropoda
- Subclass: Caenogastropoda
- Order: Neogastropoda
- Superfamily: Conoidea
- Family: Drilliidae
- Genus: Leptadrillia
- Species: L. profunda

Binomial name
- Leptadrillia profunda Fallon, 2016

Species of gastropod

Leptadrillia profunda is a species of sea snail, a marine gastropod mollusc in the family Drilliidae.

== Description ==
The length of the shell varies between 6.5 millimetres (0.26 in) and 9.0 millimetres (0.35 in). The shell appears as a hollow cone, with bumps running along the sides of the shell. There is a hole at the bottom.

== Distribution ==
This marine species occurs off Florida.
