= Globidrillia ula =

Scientific classification
- Kingdom: Animalia
- Phylum: Mollusca
- Class: Gastropoda
- Subclass: Caenogastropoda
- Order: Neogastropoda
- Superfamily: Conoidea
- Family: Drilliidae
- Genus: Globidrillia
- Species: G. ula

Binomial name
- Globidrillia ula Woodring, 1928

Synonyms
- Clavus (Globidrillia) ulla (Woodring, 1928)

Extinct species of gastropod

Globidrillia ula is an extinct species of sea snail, a marine gastropod mollusk in the family Drilliidae.

== Description ==
The length of the shell attains 5 mm, its diameter is 1.5 mm.

== Distribution ==
This extinct species was found in Pliocene strata of Jamaica, age range: 3.6 to 2.588 Ma.
