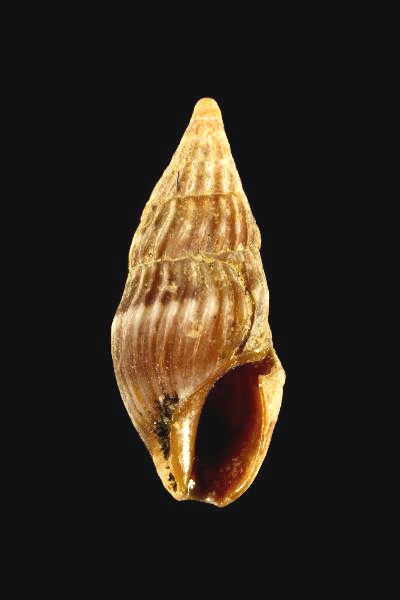
- Shell of Crassopleura maravignae (specimen at MNHN, Paris)

Scientific classification
- Kingdom: Animalia
- Phylum: Mollusca
- Class: Gastropoda
- Subclass: Caenogastropoda
- Order: Neogastropoda
- Superfamily: Conoidea
- Family: Drilliidae
- Genus: Crassopleura
- Species: C. maravignae

Binomial name
- Crassopleura maravignae (Bivona, 1838)

Synonyms
- Clavus maravignae (Bivona Ant. in Bivona And., 1838); † Crassopleura incrassata (Dujardin, 1837); † Drillia incrassata (Dujardin, 1837) (dubious synonym); † Drillia incrassata miominor (f) Sacco, F., 1904 (dubious synonym); † Drillia incrassata rhodanica (f) Fontannes, F., 1879 (dubious synonym); Drillia maravignae Bivona, 1838; Fusus semicostatus Cantraine, 1835; Pleurotoma costulata Cantraine, F.J., 1835; Pleurotoma costulatum Cantraine, F.J., 1835; Pleurotoma crebicostata Hinds; Pleurotoma elegans Scacchi, A., 1835; Pleurotoma incisa Reeve, L.A., 1843; † Pleurotoma incrassata Dujardin, F., 1837 (dubious synonym; preoccupied by Pleurotoma incrassata G.B. Sowerby I, 1834); Pleurotoma maravignae Bivona Ant. in Bivona And., 1838 (basionym)

= Crassopleura maravignae =

Species of gastropod

Crassopleura maravignae is a species of sea snail, a marine gastropod mollusk in the family Drilliidae. It is the only known species within the genus Crassopleura.

== Description ==
The shell of an adult varies between 10 mm and 15 mm. The fusiform shell is yellowish- or reddish-brown, sometimes partitioned over the spire whorls by a spiral line separating darker and lighter areas. The whole surface, including the sculpture, is smooth and glossy without any spiral element and is sometimes banded. The protoconch is markedly cyrtoconoid, with 2–3 smooth whorls. The five to six whorls of the teleoconch are usually somewhat round-shouldered. The shell is finely flexuously longitudinally plicate with about twenty plicae. These ribs are as broad as interspaces. They are opisthocline with a prosocline inflexion beneath the suture. The shell has a high spire with the body whorl less than half the total length. The body whorl has an inflated profile, not narrowing at all around the siphonal canal; with axial ribs attenuated towards the base. The aperture is ovate and is dirty white inside. It has a broad and very short siphonal canal. The aperture is distinctly thickened behind the outer lip in adults although without forming a delimited rib or varix. The outer lip is usually externally varicose. The edge of the outer lip shows a deep notch in the adapical part, then with a cutting edge and with a straight profile in lateral view. The columellar edge continues with the parietal edge, and is lined with a poorly developed callus. The parietal edge forms adapically a prominent callus which, in combination with the notch of the outer lip, forms a well-defined exhalant canal. The anal sinus is wide.

== Distribution ==
This species occurs in the Mediterranean Sea off Spain, Italy and Greece; in the Eastern Atlantic Ocean off the Azores, from Galicia to Morocco and Senegal, off the Canary Islands.
