= Cymatosyrinx fritillaria =

Scientific classification
- Kingdom: Animalia
- Phylum: Mollusca
- Class: Gastropoda
- Subclass: Caenogastropoda
- Order: Neogastropoda
- Superfamily: Conoidea
- Family: Drilliidae
- Genus: Cymatosyrinx
- Species: C. fritillaria

Binomial name
- Cymatosyrinx fritillaria (Dall, 1927)

Synonyms
- Ithycythara fritillaria (Dall, 1927); Mangilia fritillaria Dall, 1927

Species of gastropod

Cymatosyrinx fritillaria is a species of sea snail, a marine gastropod mollusk in the family Drilliidae.

== Description ==
The shell grows to a length of 6 mm, its diameter 2 mm.

(Original description) The small, slender shell is white. The smooth protoconch consists of 1½ whorl. The teleoconch consists of 3 ½ whorls. The whorls in this species are only moderately rounded and distinctly angular at the shoulder. The suture is distinct, appressed, coronated by the ends of the ribs in front,. The fasciole is sloping and hardly constricted. The axial sculpture consists of (on the body whorl about a dozen) narrow nearly straight ribs, with wider interspaces, strongest at the shoulder, obsolete on the base and toward the end of the body whorl. The spiral sculpture consists of (on the body whorl about 14) obsolete, close set, hardly perceptible equal and equally distributed small threads covering the whorl in front of the shoulder. The aperture is narrow and measures about two-fifths the whole length. The anal sulcus is feeble. The siphonal canal is hardly differentiated. The columella is straight, attenuated in front, its axis impervious.

== Distribution ==
This species occurs in the Atlantic Ocean from Georgia to Florida
