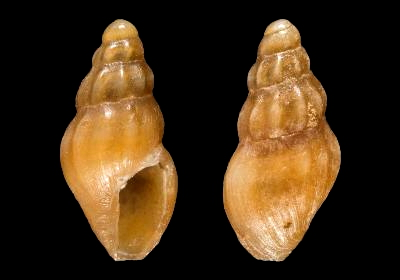
- Shell of Orrmaesia nucella (paratype in MNHN, Paris)

Scientific classification
- Kingdom: Animalia
- Phylum: Mollusca
- Class: Gastropoda
- Subclass: Caenogastropoda
- Order: Neogastropoda
- Superfamily: Conoidea
- Family: Drilliidae
- Genus: Orrmaesia
- Species: O. nucella

Binomial name
- Orrmaesia nucella Kilburn, 1988

= Orrmaesia nucella =

Species of gastropod

Orrmaesia nucella is a species of sea snail, a marine gastropod mollusk in the family Drilliidae.

== Distribution ==
This species occurs in the demersal zone of the Indian Ocean off Transkei and KwaZulu-Natal, South Africa.
