= Acinodrillia amazimba =

Scientific classification
- Kingdom: Animalia
- Phylum: Mollusca
- Class: Gastropoda
- Subclass: Caenogastropoda
- Order: Neogastropoda
- Superfamily: Conoidea
- Family: Drilliidae
- Genus: Acinodrillia
- Species: A. amazimba

Binomial name
- Acinodrillia amazimba Kilburn, 1988

Species of gastropod

Acinodrillia amazimba is a species of sea snail, a marine gastropod mollusk in the family Drilliidae.

== Description ==
The length of the brown, biconic-claviform shell varies between 8.8 mm and 9.5 mm; its width is 3.7 mm. The spiral sculpture of the shell shows sharply incised grooves, carving through the fine, raised axial ribs into small nodules.

== Distribution ==
This marine species occurs off West Transkei, South Africa.
