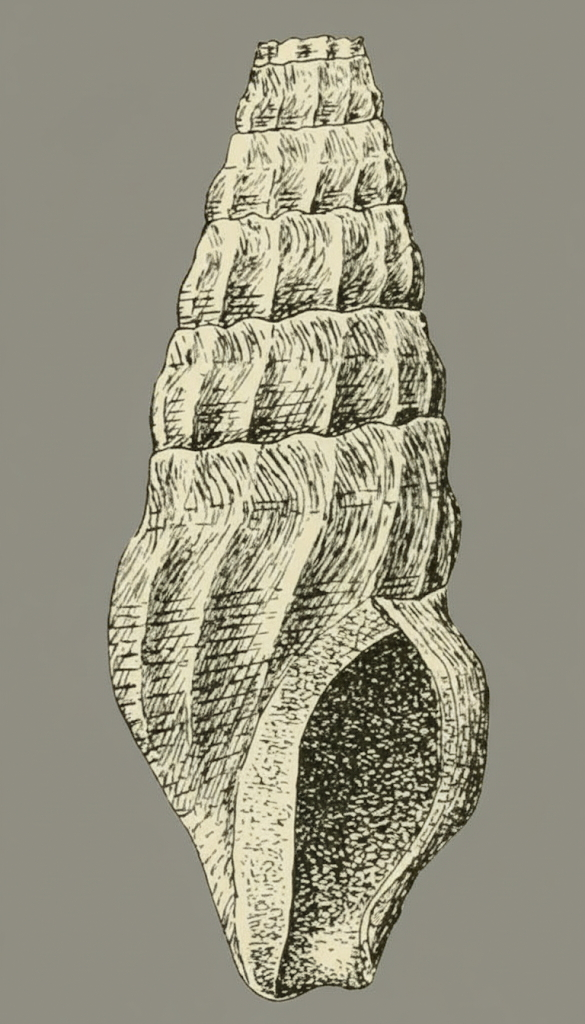
- Shell of Cymatosyrinx johnsoni (holotype)

Scientific classification
- Kingdom: Animalia
- Phylum: Mollusca
- Class: Gastropoda
- Subclass: Caenogastropoda
- Order: Neogastropoda
- Superfamily: Conoidea
- Family: Drilliidae
- Genus: Cymatosyrinx
- Species: C. johnsoni

Binomial name
- Cymatosyrinx johnsoni Arnold, 1903

Synonyms
- Drillia johnsoni R. Arnold, 1903

= Cymatosyrinx johnsoni =

Species of gastropod

Cymatosyrinx johnsoni is a species of sea snail, a marine gastropod mollusk in the family Drilliidae.

== Description ==
The length of the shell attains 32 mm, its diameter 11 mm

(Original description) This medium-sized, turreted shell comprises eight or nine nearly flat whorls. Each whorl is adorned with approximately thirteen prominent, rounded, and equally spaced oblique ribs, which originate from the anterior and extend two-thirds across the whorl before becoming nearly obsolete. A distinct sutural band occupies the upper third of each whorl, while the lower portion features five deep, channel-like sulcations (channel-like depression on the surface of the shell). The sutural band itself is marked by strong, oblique incremental lines, and the suture is appressed and undulating.

The aperture is subelliptical with an arcuate outer lip. It presents a narrow, rather deep posterior sinus and a short, recurved anterior sinus. The columella is incrusted. The convex body whorl extends downward, exhibiting revolving sulcations on its lower part, where transverse ridges are obsolete.

== Distribution ==
This species occurs in the Western Atlantic Ocean.
