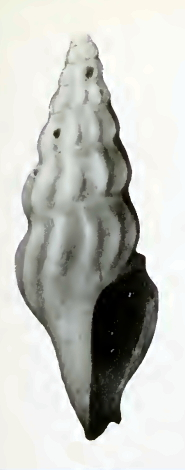
- Original image of a shell of Leptadrillia loria

Scientific classification
- Kingdom: Animalia
- Phylum: Mollusca
- Class: Gastropoda
- Subclass: Caenogastropoda
- Order: Neogastropoda
- Superfamily: Conoidea
- Family: Drilliidae
- Genus: Leptadrillia
- Species: L. loria

Binomial name
- Leptadrillia loria Bartsch P., 1934

= Leptadrillia loria =

Species of gastropod

Leptadrillia loria is a species of sea snail, a marine gastropod mollusk in the family Drilliidae.

Paul Bartsch originally misspelled this species as Leptodrillia loria. In 1973 Perrilliat renamed it as Leptadrillia loria.

== Description ==
The shell grows to a length of 6.8 mm, its diameter 2.5 mm.

(Original description) The small, vitreous, semitranslucent shell has an elongate-conic shape.. The protoconch contains 1.5 well rounded, smooth whorls. The postnuclear whorls are moderately well rounded, marked by rather strong, almost vertical axial ribs, which become weak toward the summit and which attain their largest development on the posterior third of the whorls. On the first whorl on the teleoconch these ribs are cusped; on the later ones they become less elevated. On the body whorl they extend but feebly across the base and evanesce on the columella. These ribs are about two-thirds as wide as the spaces that separate them. Eight are present on the first, and 10 on all but the body whorl, which has 12. In addition to the axial ribs the whorls are marked by fine incremental lines on the spire as well as the base. The suture is well impressed. The periphery is well rounded. The base of the shell is moderately long, well rounded. The spiral sculpture is absent on the spire and the base and present on the short, stout columella, which is crossed by nine spiral threads. The aperture rather large, strongly channeled anteriorly and posteriorly. The posterior sinus is deeply notched and immediately below the summit. There is a slender stromboid notch a little posterior to the anterior termination of the outer lip. The space between this and the posterior sinus is protracted into a clawlike element. The inner lip is appressed to the columella as a callus which extends up over the parietal wall, where it develops into a conspicuous nodule near the posterior angle.

== Distribution ==
This species occurs in the demersal zone of the Caribbean Sea off Puerto Rico at depths between 274 m and 357 m.
