= Cymatosyrinx nodulosa =

Scientific classification
- Kingdom: Animalia
- Phylum: Mollusca
- Class: Gastropoda
- Subclass: Caenogastropoda
- Order: Neogastropoda
- Superfamily: Conoidea
- Family: Drilliidae
- Genus: Cymatosyrinx
- Species: C. nodulosa

Binomial name
- Cymatosyrinx nodulosa (Jeffreys, 1882)

Synonyms
- Daphnella (Raphitoma) nodulosa Jeffreys, 1882; Defrancia nodulosa Jeffreys, 1882

Species of gastropod

Cymatosyrinx nodulosa is a species of sea snail, a marine gastropod mollusk in the family Drilliidae.

== Distribution ==
This species occurs in the demersal zone of the Mediterranean Sea.
