= Leptadrillia luciae =

Scientific classification
- Kingdom: Animalia
- Phylum: Mollusca
- Class: Gastropoda
- Subclass: Caenogastropoda
- Order: Neogastropoda
- Superfamily: Conoidea
- Family: Drilliidae
- Genus: Leptadrillia
- Species: L. luciae

Binomial name
- Leptadrillia luciae Fallon, 2016

Species of gastropod

Leptadrillia luciae is a species of sea snail, a marine gastropod mollusc in the family Drilliidae.

== Description ==
The length of the shell varies between 7.8 mm and 11 mm.

== Distribution ==
This marine species occurs off the Curaçao, Netherlands Antilles.
