= Globidrillia paucistriata =

Scientific classification
- Kingdom: Animalia
- Phylum: Mollusca
- Class: Gastropoda
- Subclass: Caenogastropoda
- Order: Neogastropoda
- Superfamily: Conoidea
- Family: Drilliidae
- Genus: Globidrillia
- Species: G. paucistriata

Binomial name
- Globidrillia paucistriata (E.A. Smith, 1888)

Synonyms
- Pleurotoma paucistriata E.A. Smith, 1888; Pleurotoma (Drillia) paucistriata E. A. Smith, 1888 (basionym)

Species of gastropod

Globidrillia paucistriata is a species of sea snail, a marine gastropod mollusk in the family Drilliidae.

== Description ==
The length of the shell attains 10 mm, its diameter 3 mm.

The white, elongate shell is slightly awl-shaped. It shows some red spots between the ribs and close to the suture and on the back of the body whorl. The shell contains nine whorls, (two in the protoconch). On the back of the body whorl there is a kind of swollen rib and the spiral striation has a semipunctate appearance. The aperture is short, measuring about 3/10th of the total length. The callous columella is on top covered by tubercles. The outer lip is incrassate. The siphonal canal is very short and recurved.

== Distribution ==
This species occurs in the demersal zone of the Pacific Ocean from California to Panama.
