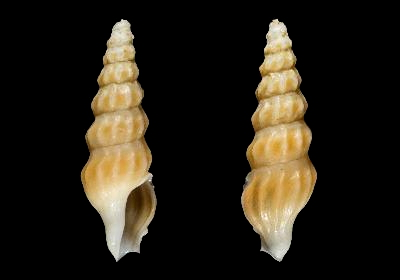
- Shell of Leptadrillia guianensis (holotype in MNHN, Paris)

Scientific classification
- Kingdom: Animalia
- Phylum: Mollusca
- Class: Gastropoda
- Subclass: Caenogastropoda
- Order: Neogastropoda
- Superfamily: Conoidea
- Family: Drilliidae
- Genus: Leptadrillia
- Species: L. guianensis

Binomial name
- Leptadrillia guianensis Fallon, 2016

= Leptadrillia guianensis =

Species of gastropod

Leptadrillia guianensis is a species of sea snail, a marine gastropod mollusc in the family Drilliidae.

== Description ==
The length of the shell varies between 15 mm and 23 mm.

== Distribution ==
This marine species occurs off the French Guiana.
