= Imaclava pilsbryi =

Scientific classification
- Kingdom: Animalia
- Phylum: Mollusca
- Class: Gastropoda
- Subclass: Caenogastropoda
- Order: Neogastropoda
- Superfamily: Conoidea
- Family: Drilliidae
- Genus: Imaclava
- Species: I. pilsbryi

Binomial name
- Imaclava pilsbryi Bartsch, 1950

Synonyms
- Clathrodrillia (Imaclava) pilsbryi (Bartsch, 1950); Clavus (Imaclava) pilsbryi (Bartsch, 1950); Drillia (Imaclava) pilsbryi (Bartsch, 1950)

Species of gastropod

Imaclava pilsbryi is a species of sea snail, a marine gastropod mollusk in the family Drilliidae.

== Description ==
The size of an adult shell varies between 20 mm and 30 mm.

== Distribution ==
This species occurs in the demersal zone of the Eastern Pacific Ocean from Sonora, Mexico to El Salvador.
