= Sedilia aphanitoma =

Scientific classification
- Kingdom: Animalia
- Phylum: Mollusca
- Class: Gastropoda
- Subclass: Caenogastropoda
- Order: Neogastropoda
- Superfamily: Conoidea
- Family: Drilliidae
- Genus: Sedilia
- Species: S. aphanitoma

Binomial name
- Sedilia aphanitoma W. H. Dall, 1892

Extinct species of gastropod

Sedilia aphanitoma is an extinct species of sea snail, a marine gastropod mollusc in the family Drilliidae.

== Distribution ==
This extinct marine species was found in Quaternary strata of Florida in the United States; age range: 2.588 to 0.781 Ma.
