= Leptadrillia maryae =

Scientific classification
- Kingdom: Animalia
- Phylum: Mollusca
- Class: Gastropoda
- Subclass: Caenogastropoda
- Order: Neogastropoda
- Superfamily: Conoidea
- Family: Drilliidae
- Genus: Leptadrillia
- Species: L. maryae

Binomial name
- Leptadrillia maryae Fallon, 2016

Species of gastropod

Leptadrillia maryae is a species of sea snail, a marine gastropod mollusc in the family Drilliidae.

== Description ==
The length of the shell attains 7.9 mm. Shell is very small and narrowly fusiform. It is glossy and translucent. The whorls are moderately convex with peripheries just below mid-whor. There are 9¼, the last of which is approximately 56% of the total length;. The aperture is narrow, with the anal sinus and anterior canal only slightly narrower and a sculpture of axial ribs. Protoconch is approximately 3 smooth, round translucent whorls. A spiral sculpture is largely absent except for threads on the anterior fasciole. There is no sulcus. The outer lip is thin, with 2 slender strengthening axial folds; lip edge flexed only slightly outward near the anal sinus, otherwise projecting out in a nearly circular arc from the anal sinus to stromboid notch; stromboid notch shallow and wide. Anal sinus deep, U-shaped, offset from the axis of the shell by the parietal wall and lobe and slight outward flex of the outer lip near the sinus such that it appears spout-like. The inner lip is narrow, recumbent, margined; thicker on the anterior portion of the columella, and developed into a weak parietal lobe posteriorly. Anterior canal is long, open, and turned right at its end when viewed ventrally, unnotched; fasciole is not swollen, and spiral threads are present. The shell is pale golden brown, ribs, anterior canal and outer lip are lighter.

== Distribution ==
This marine species occurs in the Caribbean Sea off Colombia.
