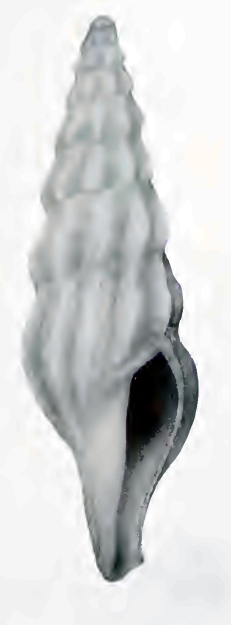
- Original image of a shell of Leptadrillia splendida

Scientific classification
- Kingdom: Animalia
- Phylum: Mollusca
- Class: Gastropoda
- Subclass: Caenogastropoda
- Order: Neogastropoda
- Superfamily: Conoidea
- Family: Drilliidae
- Genus: Leptadrillia
- Species: L. splendida

Binomial name
- Leptadrillia splendida Bartsch, 1934

Synonyms
- Cymatosyrinx (Leptadrillia) splendida (Bartsch, 1934)

= Leptadrillia splendida =

Species of gastropod

Leptadrillia splendida is a species of sea snail, a marine gastropod mollusk in the family Drilliidae.

== Description ==
The length of the shell varies between 7.5 mm and 9.2 mm.

(Original description) The small, shiny shell has an elongate-conic shape.. Nuclear whorls The protoconch contains 1.5 well rounded, smooth whorls. The postnuclear whorls are moderately well rounded with strongly developed axial ribs, which begin weakly at the summit of the whorls and become strongest at about the anterior termination of the posterior third, again gradually weakening on the base and evanescing on the columella. These ribs on the early whorls are cusped at their highest elevation. On the later whorls the cusps become less pronounced. Ten occur upon all but the body whorl, which has twelve There is a very strong varix a little distance behind the outer lip. The lines of growth are exceedingly fine, and the spiral sculpture is absent on all but the columella, thus giving to the entire surface of the shell a decidedly glassy appearance. On the anterior two-thirds of the columella nine slender spiral threads are present. The aperture is rather broad, decidedly channeled anteriorly and posteriorly. The posterior channel is at the summit of the whorl and is deeply incised. The outer lip from the channel to the slender notch anteriorly is protracted into a clawlike element. The inner lip is appressed to the columella as a heavy callus that extends over the parietal wall and forms a decided knob over the posterior angle.

== Distribution ==
This species occurs in the demersal zone of the Caribbean Sea off Puerto Rico.
