= Wairarapa (disambiguation) =

Wairarapa (often expressed as The Wairarapa) is a region in New Zealand.

Wairarapa may also refer to:

== Geography ==
- Lake Wairarapa, a lake from which the region gets its name

=== Political and regional administration ===
- Wairarapa (New Zealand electorate), a parliamentary electorate
- Wairarapa North, a former parliamentary electorate
- Wairarapa South, a former parliamentary electorate
- Wairarapa and Hawke's Bay (New Zealand electorate), a former parliamentary electorate
- South Wairarapa District, an administrative area

== Sport ==
- Wairarapa Bush Rugby Football Union, a rugby union club

- Wairarapa Rugby Football Union, a rugby union club merged into the Wairarapa Bush Rugby Football Union

- Wairarapa United, a football club

== Transport ==
- Wairarapa Line, a railway line in the Wairarapa region
- NZR RM class (Wairarapa), a railcar
- Wairarapa Mail, a former train service
- Wairarapa Connection, an interurban commuter rail service
- SS Wairarapa, a ship that sank in 1894

== Other uses ==
- Wairarapa (gastropod), a genus of sea snails
- Radio Wairarapa, a radio station
