= Leptadrillia lucaya =

Scientific classification
- Kingdom: Animalia
- Phylum: Mollusca
- Class: Gastropoda
- Subclass: Caenogastropoda
- Order: Neogastropoda
- Superfamily: Conoidea
- Family: Drilliidae
- Genus: Leptadrillia
- Species: L. lucaya

Binomial name
- Leptadrillia lucaya Fallon, 2016

Species of gastropod

Leptadrillia lucaya is a species of sea snail, a marine gastropod mollusc in the family Drilliidae.

== Description ==
The length of the shell attains 17 mm. Leptadrillia lucaya is known for its slender and elongated shell, which is typical of the Drilliidae family. The shell's appearance is usually smooth with subtle ridges or grooves that run longitudinally. The coloration of the shell can vary, often featuring earthy tones like light brown or cream, sometimes with darker markings or bands. The aperture, or opening, of the shell is elongated and narrow.

== Distribution ==
This marine species occurs off the Bahamas.
