= Leptadrillia lizae =

Scientific classification
- Kingdom: Animalia
- Phylum: Mollusca
- Class: Gastropoda
- Subclass: Caenogastropoda
- Order: Neogastropoda
- Superfamily: Conoidea
- Family: Drilliidae
- Genus: Leptadrillia
- Species: L. lizae

Binomial name
- Leptadrillia lizae Fallon, 2016

Species of gastropod

Leptadrillia lizae is a species of sea snail, a marine gastropod mollusc in the family Drilliidae.

== Distribution ==
This marine species occurs off the Campeche Bank, Yucatán, Mexico.
