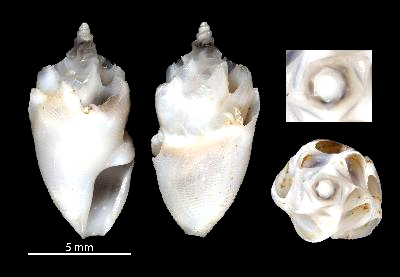
- Shells of Conopleura latiaxisa (paratype in the MNHN, Paris)

Scientific classification
- Kingdom: Animalia
- Phylum: Mollusca
- Class: Gastropoda
- Subclass: Caenogastropoda
- Order: Neogastropoda
- Superfamily: Conoidea
- Family: Drilliidae
- Genus: Conopleura
- Species: C. latiaxisa

Binomial name
- Conopleura latiaxisa Chino, 2011

= Conopleura latiaxisa =

Species of gastropod

Conopleura latiaxisa is a species of sea snail, a marine gastropod mollusk in the family Drilliidae.

== Description ==
Its shell is relatively small for the genus, around 11 mm in length, slender shaped, thick, solid and semi-fusiform, early four whorls elate, acuminate spire, well swollen periphery. The body whorl is half of the shell length, with a protoconch of about 1.5 whorls. The teleoconch consists of around 5 to 6 convex whorls with a tall spire. Narrow axial ribs reach from suture to suture.

== Distribution ==
The species is only known from the type locality, which is situated between 180 and 250 m deep, near Mactan Island, Cebu, the Philippines.

== Habitat ==
The species lives on sandy mud with small gravel.

== Etymology ==
The word "latiaxisa" refers to the particular characteristics of trigonal spines, which reminds one of the genus Latiaxis in the subfamily Coralliophiliinae in the Muricidae.
