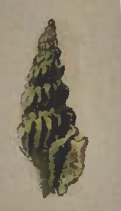
- Drawing of a shell of Globidrillia micans

Scientific classification
- Kingdom: Animalia
- Phylum: Mollusca
- Class: Gastropoda
- Subclass: Caenogastropoda
- Order: Neogastropoda
- Superfamily: Conoidea
- Family: Drilliidae
- Genus: Globidrillia
- Species: G. micans

Binomial name
- Globidrillia micans (Hinds, 1843)

Synonyms
- Clavatula micans Hinds, 1843 (basionym); Clavus micans DuShane & Brennan, 1969; Elaeocyma aeolia Dall, 1919

= Globidrillia micans =

Species of gastropod

Globidrillia micans is a species of sea snail, a marine gastropod mollusk in the family Drilliidae.

== Description ==
The size of an adult shell varies between 7 mm and 15 mm. The chestnut-colored shell has small, rather sharp, whitish, oblique ribs, fading towards the suture. The back of the body whorl is smooth. The outer lip is thin, acute and smooth within.

== Distribution ==
This species occurs in the demersal zone of the Pacific Ocean off Nicaragua and Costa Rica.
