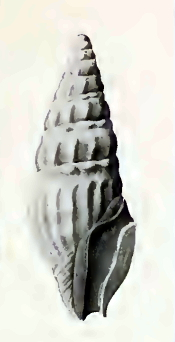
- Original image of a shell of Wairarapa duplaris

Scientific classification
- Kingdom: Animalia
- Phylum: Mollusca
- Class: Gastropoda
- Subclass: Caenogastropoda
- Order: Neogastropoda
- Superfamily: Conoidea
- Family: Drilliidae
- Genus: Wairarapa
- Species: W. duplaris

Binomial name
- Wairarapa duplaris (Hedley, 1922)

Synonyms
- Crassispira (Crassispira) duplaris (Hedley, 1922); Melatoma duplaris Hedley, 1922 (original combination)

= Wairarapa duplaris =

Species of gastropod

Wairarapa duplaris is a species of sea snail, a marine gastropod mollusk in the family Drilliidae.

== Description ==
The length of the shell attains 8 mm, its diameter 3 mm.

(Original description) The small, solid shell has a lanceolate shape. Its colour is dull cream, with a faint dorsal zone of brown. It contains 8 whorls, including a two-whorled protoconch. The radial sculpture is smooth and consists of round-backed perpendicular ribs truncated by a smooth and constricted fasciole, amounting to eleven on the penultimate whorl. On the earlier part of the body whorl these ribs are smaller and closer together than previously. Half a whorl behind the aperture is a rough varix, beyond which the ribs cease. The spiral sculpture on the base shows about a dozen fine grooves. Between the suture and the fasciole is a spiral ridge which tends to break up into beads opposite the ribs. The aperture is narrow. The sinus is C-shaped. A thick callus knob occurs at the right insertion.

== Distribution ==
This marine species is endemic to Australia and occurs off Queensland.
