= Wairarapa rebecca =

Scientific classification
- Kingdom: Animalia
- Phylum: Mollusca
- Class: Gastropoda
- Subclass: Caenogastropoda
- Order: Neogastropoda
- Superfamily: Conoidea
- Family: Drilliidae
- Genus: Wairarapa
- Species: W. rebecca

Binomial name
- Wairarapa rebecca Vella, 1954

Extinct species of gastropod

Wairarapa rebecca is an extinct species of sea snail in the family Drilliidae. This species is endemic to New Zealand.
