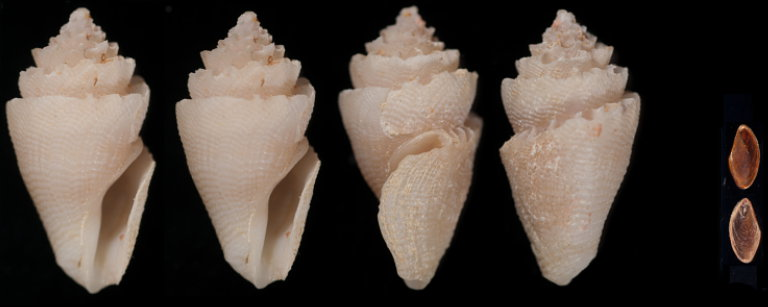
- Shell of Conopleura striata (specimen at the Smithsonian Institution)

Scientific classification
- Kingdom: Animalia
- Phylum: Mollusca
- Class: Gastropoda
- Subclass: Caenogastropoda
- Order: Neogastropoda
- Superfamily: Conoidea
- Family: Drilliidae
- Genus: Conopleura
- Species: C. striata

Binomial name
- Conopleura striata Hinds, 1844

Synonyms
- Drillia striata Hinds, 1844; Pleurotoma partita Reeve, L.A., 1846

= Conopleura striata =

Species of gastropod

Conopleura striata is a species of sea snail, a marine gastropod mollusk in the family Drilliidae.

== Description ==
The size of an adult shell varies between 13 mm and 159 mm and has a biconical shape. The shell consists of a protoconch of 2.5 whorls and 7-8 whorls in the teleoconch. The acuminate spire is turreted. The shoulder of each whorl is somewhat tabulate, with numerous septa crossing to the sutures. The shoulder angle is somewhat coronate. The surface of the shell is finely spirally striate. The anal sinus is broad and deep. The body whorl constitutes about half the total length. The narrow aperture is sinuous. The thick siphonal canal is short and broad. The color of the shell is whitish or yellowish. Reeve has given a drawing of a reversed shell, a rarity in this genus.

== Distribution ==
This marine species occurs off the Philippines, in the Pacific Ocean off Indonesia and New Guinea to Japan.
