= Leptadrillia cinereopellis =

Scientific classification
- Kingdom: Animalia
- Phylum: Mollusca
- Class: Gastropoda
- Subclass: Caenogastropoda
- Order: Neogastropoda
- Superfamily: Conoidea
- Family: Drilliidae
- Genus: Leptadrillia
- Species: L. cinereopellis

Binomial name
- Leptadrillia cinereopellis Kuroda, Habe & Oyama, 1971

Synonyms
- Inquisitor cinereopellis (Kuroda, Habe & Oyama, 1971); Latadrillia cinereopellis (Kuroda, Habe & Oyama, 1971)

Species of gastropod

Leptadrillia cinereopellis is a species of sea snail, a marine gastropod mollusk in the family Drilliidae.

== Description ==
The length of the shell varies between 23 mm and 30 mm.

== Distribution ==
This species occurs in the demersal zone in the Northwest Pacific Ocean off Japan and the South China Sea.
