= Acinodrillia viscum =

Scientific classification
- Kingdom: Animalia
- Phylum: Mollusca
- Class: Gastropoda
- Subclass: Caenogastropoda
- Order: Neogastropoda
- Superfamily: Conoidea
- Family: Drilliidae
- Genus: Acinodrillia
- Species: A. viscum

Binomial name
- Acinodrillia viscum Kilburn, 1988

South African species of sea snails

Acinodrillia viscum is a species of sea snail, a marine gastropod mollusk in the family Drilliidae.

== Description ==
The length of the white, claviform shell varies between 7.2 mm and 8.9 mm; its width is 3.1 mm. The spiral sculpture of the shell shows sharply incised grooves, carving through the strong, raised axial ribs into distinct, coarse nodules.

== Distribution ==
This marine species occurs off East Transkei, South Africa.
