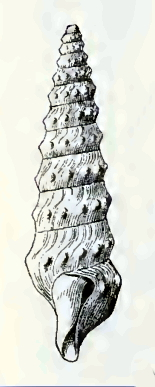
- Drawing of a shell of Globidrillia smirna

Scientific classification
- Kingdom: Animalia
- Phylum: Mollusca
- Class: Gastropoda
- Subclass: Caenogastropoda
- Order: Neogastropoda
- Superfamily: Conoidea
- Family: Drilliidae
- Genus: Globidrillia
- Species: G. smirna

Binomial name
- Globidrillia smirna (Dall, 1881)

Synonyms
- Drillia smirna (Dall, 1881); Pleurotoma (Drillia) smirna Dall, 1881 (basionym); Pleurotoma smirna (Dall, 1881)

= Globidrillia smirna =

Species of gastropod

Globidrillia smirna is a species of sea snail, a marine gastropod mollusk in the family Drilliidae.

== Description ==
The shell grows to a length of 15 mm, its diameter 3.25 mm. The original description of the species was as follows:

The long, slender shell shines with the lustre of barley-sugar candy. It contains 12 whorls, of which two are in the protoconch. These two are white, smooth, rather large, inflated, polished, not sculptured except by lines of growth, changing suddenly into the normal sculpture. The sculpture consisting of small pointed nodules set on the periphery of the whorls, a little in advance of midway between the sutures. They number ten to fourteen on each whorl, except the last half-whorl in the adult, where they begin to be obsolete. The tips of these nodules and a line just in advance of the suture are white as compared with the general translucent pinkish or fleshy hue. These nodules are a little compressed in the latter whorls in a direction transverse to the whorls. The lines of growth are distinct and in the later whorls occasionally a little prominent at the suture, against which the shell is appressed. There is no other transverse sculpture. The revolving sculpture is comprised in fifteen or twenty threads on the body whorl, faintly visible at the periphery and gradually becoming stronger toward the end of the siphonal canal An occasional trace of such might be visible on some of the older whorls. The anal sulcus is moderately deep. The notch-band is not strongly marked. The outer in the adult is produced (but imperfect in our specimens), apparently having the usual form. The columella is obliquely cut off anteriorly, covered with a light callus. The siphonal canal is narrow. The aperture is short and seemingly rather wide, behind.

— Dall, W. H., "Reports on the results of dredging, under the supervision of Alexander Agassiz, in the Gulf of Mexico, and in the Caribbean Sea, 1877–79, by the United States Coast Survey Steamer 'Blake'", Bulletin of the Museum of Comparative Zoology 9: 33–144

== Distribution ==
This species occurs in the demersal zone of the Caribbean Sea (Cuba) and the Gulf of Mexico at depths between 699 m and 755 m.
