= Leptadrillia violacea =

Scientific classification
- Kingdom: Animalia
- Phylum: Mollusca
- Class: Gastropoda
- Subclass: Caenogastropoda
- Order: Neogastropoda
- Superfamily: Conoidea
- Family: Drilliidae
- Genus: Leptadrillia
- Species: L. violacea

Binomial name
- Leptadrillia violacea Fallon, 2016

Species of gastropod

Leptadrillia violacea is a species of sea snail, a marine gastropod mollusc in the family Drilliidae.

== Description ==
The length of the shell varies between 9 mm and 11.5 mm.

== Distribution ==
This marine species occurs in the Caribbean Sea off Guadeloupe.
