= Orrmaesia ancilla =

Scientific classification
- Kingdom: Animalia
- Phylum: Mollusca
- Class: Gastropoda
- Subclass: Caenogastropoda
- Order: Neogastropoda
- Superfamily: Conoidea
- Family: Drilliidae
- Genus: Orrmaesia
- Species: O. ancilla

Binomial name
- Orrmaesia ancilla (Thiele, 1925)

Synonyms
- Drillia ancilla Thiele, 1925 (original combination); Mangilia innotabilis Turton, 1932; Orrmaesia innotabilis W.H. Turton, 1932

Species of gastropod

Orrmaesia ancilla is a species of sea snail, a marine gastropod mollusk in the family Drilliidae.

== Distribution ==
This species occurs in the demersal zone of the Indian Ocean off the Agulhas Bank and the Eastern Cape, South Africa
