= Cymatosyrinx impolita =

Scientific classification
- Kingdom: Animalia
- Phylum: Mollusca
- Class: Gastropoda
- Subclass: Caenogastropoda
- Order: Neogastropoda
- Superfamily: Conoidea
- Family: Drilliidae
- Genus: Cymatosyrinx
- Species: C. impolita

Binomial name
- Cymatosyrinx impolita Kuroda, Habe & Oyama, 1971

Species of gastropod

Cymatosyrinx impolita is a species of sea snail, a marine gastropod mollusk in the family Drilliidae.

== Distribution ==
This species occurs in the demersal zone of the Pacific Ocean off Japan.
