= Orrmaesia dorsicosta =

Scientific classification
- Kingdom: Animalia
- Phylum: Mollusca
- Class: Gastropoda
- Subclass: Caenogastropoda
- Order: Neogastropoda
- Superfamily: Conoidea
- Family: Drilliidae
- Genus: Orrmaesia
- Species: O. dorsicosta

Binomial name
- Orrmaesia dorsicosta Kilburn, 1988

Species of gastropod

Orrmaesia dorsicosta is a species of sea snail, a marine gastropod mollusk in the family Drilliidae.

== Description ==
The shell grows to a length of 5 mm.

== Distribution ==
This species occurs in the demersal zone of the Southeast Atlantic Ocean off Transkei and Zululand, South Africa.
