= Leptadrillia moorei =

Scientific classification
- Kingdom: Animalia
- Phylum: Mollusca
- Class: Gastropoda
- Subclass: Caenogastropoda
- Order: Neogastropoda
- Superfamily: Conoidea
- Family: Drilliidae
- Genus: Leptadrillia
- Species: L. moorei

Binomial name
- Leptadrillia moorei Fallon, 2016

Species of gastropod

Leptadrillia moorei is a species of sea snail, a marine gastropod mollusc in the family Drilliidae.

== Description ==
The length of the shell varies between 6 mm and 10 mm.

== Distribution ==
This marine species occurs off Florida.
