= Acinodrillia paula =

Scientific classification
- Kingdom: Animalia
- Phylum: Mollusca
- Class: Gastropoda
- Subclass: Caenogastropoda
- Order: Neogastropoda
- Superfamily: Conoidea
- Family: Drilliidae
- Genus: Acinodrillia
- Species: A. paula

Binomial name
- Acinodrillia paula (Thiele, 1925)

Synonyms
- Pleurotoma paula Thiele, 1925

Species of gastropod

Acinodrillia paula is a species of sea snail, a marine gastropod mollusk in the family Drilliidae.

== Description ==
The length of the claviform shell attains 11.8 mm, its width 4.2 mm. It shows the general characteristics of the genus, but is especially characterized by the axial grooves that are cut on the body whorl by spiral grooves, forming a lozenge-shaped pattern.

== Distribution ==
This marine species occurs in the Agulhas Bank, South Africa
