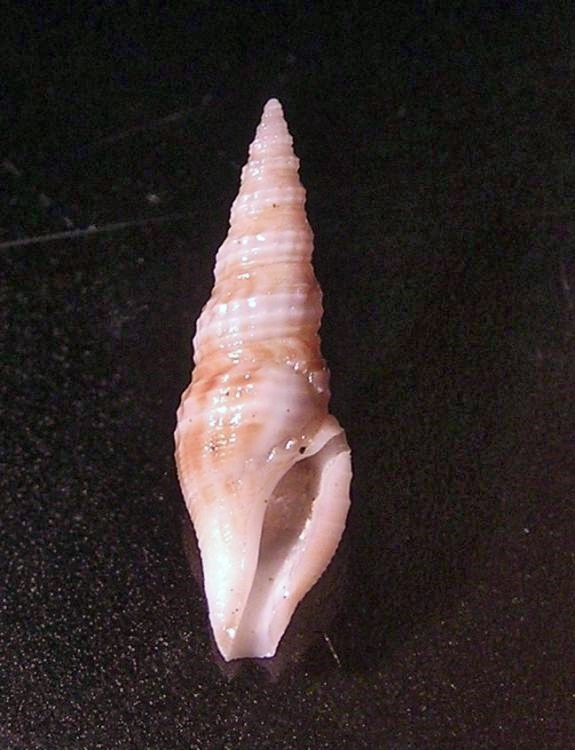

Scientific classification
- Kingdom: Animalia
- Phylum: Mollusca
- Class: Gastropoda
- Subclass: Caenogastropoda
- Order: Neogastropoda
- Superfamily: Conoidea
- Family: Drilliidae
- Genus: Cymatosyrinx
- Species: C. parciplicata

Binomial name
- Cymatosyrinx parciplicata (G.B. Sowerby III, 1915)

Synonyms
- Drillia parciplicata Sowerby III, 1915

= Cymatosyrinx parciplicata =

Species of sea snail

Cymatosyrinx parciplicata is a species of sea snail, a marine gastropod mollusk in the family Drilliidae.

== Description ==
The shell grows to a length of 23 mm.

The shell is elongate-acuminate. Its color is dark white. The spire is elongate and contains 7 whorls. The first one is rounded, the second whorl is slightly convex, the others are convex and obtusely angulated. They show a few smooth oblique plicae. The interstices between the ribs are rather smooth. The body whorl is oblong and slightly convex on top and with a short, but conspicuous, fold below the suture. There is no dorsal varix. The siphonal canal is truncated. The columella is nearly straight and very thin plated.

== Distribution ==
This species occurs in the demersal zone of the subtropical Northwest Pacific Ocean off Japan and the Philippines.
