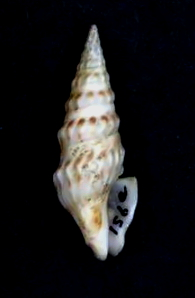
- Apertural view of a shell of Imaclava unimaculata (museum specimen at Naturalis Biodiversity Center)

Scientific classification
- Kingdom: Animalia
- Phylum: Mollusca
- Class: Gastropoda
- Subclass: Caenogastropoda
- Order: Neogastropoda
- Superfamily: Conoidea
- Family: Drilliidae
- Genus: Imaclava
- Species: I. unimaculata

Binomial name
- Imaclava unimaculata (Sowerby I, 1834)

Synonyms
- Clathrodrillia unimaculata (Sowerby I, 1834); Clathrodrillia (Imaclava) unimaculata (Sowerby I, 1834); Clavus pembertoni H. N. Lowe, 1935; Clavus unimaculata (Sowerby I, 1834); Clavus (Imaclava) unimaculata (Sowerby I, 1834); Drillia (Brachystoma) unimaculata (Sowerby I, 1834); Drillia (Crassispira) unimaculata (Sowerby I, 1834); Drillia (Imaclava) unimaculata (Sowerby I, 1834); Imaclava pembertoni (H. N. Lowe, 1935) (junior synonym); Pleurotoma unimaculata Sowerby I, 1834 (basionym); Pleurotoma (Drillia) unimaculata (Sowerby I, 1834)

= Imaclava unimaculata =

Species of gastropod

Imaclava unimaculata, common name the brown-spot turrid, is a species of sea snail, a marine gastropod mollusk in the family Drilliidae.

== Taxonomy ==
- Imaclava unimaculata belongs to the family Drilliidae, a group of predatory marine snails often referred to as turrids. Members of this family are characterized by elongate shells and complex radular teeth used for capturing prey.
- Imaclava pembertoni was originally described as Clavus pembertoni by H. N. Lowe in 1935, based on material collected off Punta Peñasco, Sonora, Mexico, and published in Transactions of the San Diego Society of Natural History 8(6): 15–34.

== Description ==
The size of an adult shell varies between 25 mm and 47 mm.

The shell is elongate, with a high spire and a siphonal canal typical of the family. The sculpture consists of axial ribs and spiral grooves, giving the shell a textured appearance. The shell lacks a sutural band or spiral striae. The knobs on the periphery are rather short, instead of terminating ribs as in Clathrodrillia gibbosa (Born, 1778). The shell is yellowish brown, spotted with chestnut, and with one large spot on the back of the body whorl.

According to Lowe (1935), the shell is "elongate oval-conic to rather turriculate-conic", with about six flat-sided whorls (only four preserved in the specimen examined), and a narrow juxtasutural band delineated by a vague spiral depression.

== Distribution ==
This species occurs in the demersal zone of the Pacific Ocean from Sea of Cortez, along the western coast of Mexico to Colombia. Records indicate its habitat is primarily shallow to moderately deep marine environments, often associated with sandy or muddy substrates.
