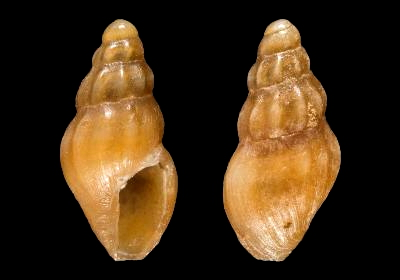
- Shell of Orrmaesia nucella

Scientific classification
- Kingdom: Animalia
- Phylum: Mollusca
- Class: Gastropoda
- Subclass: Caenogastropoda
- Order: Neogastropoda
- Superfamily: Conoidea
- Family: Drilliidae
- Genus: Orrmaesia; Kilburn, 1988

Type species
- Orrmaesia dorsicosta Kilburn, 1988

Species
- See text

= Orrmaesia =

Genus of gastropods

Orrmaesia is a genus of sea snails, marine gastropod mollusks in the family Drilliidae.

== Species ==
Species within the genus Orrmaesia include:

- Orrmaesia ancilla (Thiele, 1925)
- Orrmaesia dorsicosta Kilburn, 1988
- Orrmaesia longiqua Horro, Gori, Rosado & Rolán, 2021
- Orrmaesia microperforata Horro, Gori, Rosado & Rolán, 2021
- Orrmaesia nucella Kilburn, 1988

Species brought into synonymy

- Orrmaesia innotabilis W.H. Turton, 1932: synonym of Orrmaesia ancilla (K.H.J. Thiele, 1925)
