= Globidrillia strohbeeni =

Scientific classification
- Kingdom: Animalia
- Phylum: Mollusca
- Class: Gastropoda
- Subclass: Caenogastropoda
- Order: Neogastropoda
- Superfamily: Conoidea
- Family: Drilliidae
- Genus: Globidrillia
- Species: G. strohbeeni

Binomial name
- Globidrillia strohbeeni (Hertlein & Strong, 1951)

Synonyms
- Clavus strohbeeni (Hertlein & Strong, 1951); Cymatosyrinx strohbeeni Hertlein & Strong, 1951 (basionym)

Species of gastropod

Globidrillia strohbeeni is a species of sea snail, a marine gastropod mollusk in the family Drilliidae.

== Description ==
The size of an adult shell varies between 8 mm and 12 mm.

== Distribution ==
This species occurs in the demersal zone of the Eastern Pacific Ocean off the Baja California peninsula.
