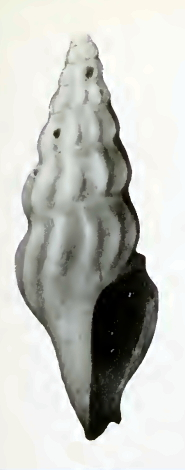
- Original image of a shell of Leptadrillia loria

Scientific classification
- Kingdom: Animalia
- Phylum: Mollusca
- Class: Gastropoda
- Subclass: Caenogastropoda
- Order: Neogastropoda
- Superfamily: Conoidea
- Family: Drilliidae
- Genus: Leptadrillia; Woodring, 1928

Type species
- † Turris parkeri Gabb, 1873

Species
- See text

= Leptadrillia =

Genus of gastropods

Leptadrillia is a genus of sea snails, marine gastropod mollusks in the family Drilliidae.

== Description ==
The species in Leptadrillia have a dorsal varix.

== Species ==
Species within the genus Leptadrillia include:

- Leptadrillia campechensis Fallon, 2016
- Leptadrillia cinereopellis Kuroda, Habe & Oyama, 1971
- Leptadrillia elissa (Dall, 1919)
- Leptadrillia firmichorda McLean & Poorman, 1971
- Leptadrillia flavomaculata Fallon, 2016
- Leptadrillia guianensis Fallon, 2016
- Leptadrillia histriata Fallon, 2016
- Leptadrillia incarnata Fallon, 2016
- Leptadrillia lizae Fallon, 2016
- Leptadrillia loria Bartsch, 1934
- Leptadrillia lucaya Fallon, 2016
- Leptadrillia luciae Fallon, 2016
- Leptadrillia maryae Fallon, 2016
- Leptadrillia moorei Fallon, 2016
- † Leptadrillia parkeri (Gabb, 1873)
- Leptadrillia profunda Fallon, 2016
- Leptadrillia quisqualis (Hinds, 1843)
- Leptadrillia splendida Bartsch, 1934
- Leptadrillia violacea Fallon, 2016

Species brought into synonymy

- Leptadrillia albicoma (Dall, 1889): synonym of Neodrillia albicoma (Dall, 1889)
- Leptadrillia aomoriensis Nomura & Hatai, 1940: synonym of Splendrillia aomoriensis (Nomura & Hatai, 1940)
- Leptadrillia cookei (E. A. Smith, 1888): synonym of Syntomodrillia cookei (E. A. Smith, 1888)
