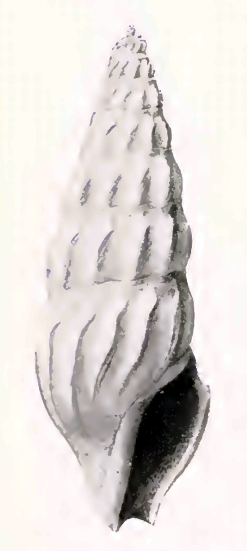
- Image of a shell of Globidrillia ferminiana

Scientific classification
- Kingdom: Animalia
- Phylum: Mollusca
- Class: Gastropoda
- Subclass: Caenogastropoda
- Order: Neogastropoda
- Superfamily: Conoidea
- Family: Drilliidae
- Genus: Globidrillia; Woodring, 1928

Type species
- Globidrillia ula Woodring, W.P., 1928

Species
- See text

= Globidrillia =

Genus of gastropods

Globidrillia is a genus of sea snails, marine gastropod mollusks in the family Drilliidae.

Previously it was included in the subfamily Clavinae of the family Turridae as a subgenus Elaeocyma (Globidrillia) Woodring, 1928.

This genus includes only bathyal species.

== Species ==
Species within the genus Globidrillia include:

- Globidrillia ferminiana (Dall, 1919)
- Globidrillia hemphillii (Stearns, 1871)
- Globidrillia micans (Hinds, 1843)
- Globidrillia paucistriata (Smith E. A., 1888)
- Globidrillia smirna (Dall, 1881)
- Globidrillia strohbeeni (Hertlein & Strong, 1951)
- † Globidrillia ula Woodring, 1928: (synonym Clavus (Globidrillia) ulla (Woodring, 1928) )

Species brought into synonymy

- Globidrillia aeolia W.H. Dall, 1919: synonym of Globidrillia micans (Hinds, 1843)
- Globidrillia aglaophanes R.B. Watson, 1882: synonym of Clionella aglaophanes (R.B. Watson, 1882)
