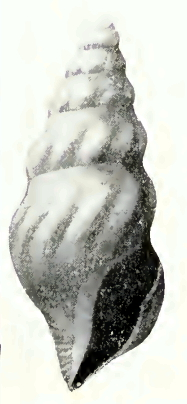
- Original image of a shell of Cymatosyrinx idothea

Scientific classification
- Kingdom: Animalia
- Phylum: Mollusca
- Class: Gastropoda
- Subclass: Caenogastropoda
- Order: Neogastropoda
- Superfamily: Conoidea
- Family: Drilliidae
- Genus: Cymatosyrinx
- Species: C. idothea

Binomial name
- Cymatosyrinx idothea Dall, 1919

= Cymatosyrinx idothea =

Species of gastropod

Cymatosyrinx idothea is a species of sea snail, a marine gastropod mollusk in the family Drilliidae.

== Description ==
The shell grows to a length of 9 mm, its diameter 4 mm.

(Original description) The small, thin, acute shell is rose pink and not polished. It has a blunt protoconch of one and a half smooth inflated whorls, and five well rounded subsequent whorls. The suture is distinct and appressed. The adjacent fasciole is constricted. There is no spiral sculpture. The axial sculpture consists of (on the body whorl about a dozen) protractively oblique sigmoid riblets, faint on the base and practically absent from the fasciole, with subequal interspaces. The aperture is moderately wide. The anal sulcus is wide and deep, adjacent to the suture and with no subsutural callus. The outer lip is thin, sharp and prominently produced. The inner lip is erased. The columella is stout, short, white and obliquely attenuated in front. The siphonal canal is wide, short and hardly differentiated from the aperture.

== Distribution ==
This marine species occurs in the Straits of Magellan.
