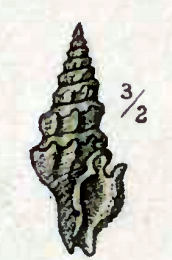
- Drawing of a shell Leptadrillia quisqualis

Scientific classification
- Kingdom: Animalia
- Phylum: Mollusca
- Class: Gastropoda
- Subclass: Caenogastropoda
- Order: Neogastropoda
- Superfamily: Conoidea
- Family: Drilliidae
- Genus: Leptadrillia
- Species: L. quisqualis

Binomial name
- Leptadrillia quisqualis (Hinds, 1843)

Synonyms
- Clathurella quisqualis (Hinds, 1843); Clavatula quisqualis Hinds, 1843 (basionym); Clavus (Cymatosyrinx) quisqualis (Hinds, 1843); Cymatosyrinx quisqualis (Hinds, 1843); Daphnella quisqualis (Hinds, 1843); Mangilia quisqualis (Hinds, 1843); Pleurotoma quisqualis (Hinds, 1843); Pleurotoma (Brachytoma) quisqualis (Hinds, 1843)

= Leptadrillia quisqualis =

Species of gastropod

Leptadrillia quisqualis is a species of sea snail, a marine gastropod mollusk in the family Drilliidae.

== Description ==
The shell grows to a length of 11 mm. The white shell is obtusely angulated, smooth above the angle, which is nodose by the termination of short longitudinal ribs.

== Distribution ==
This species occurs in the demersal zone of the Pacific Ocean off Nicaragua. Clathurella quisqalis (Hinds, 1843) has also been described from Darnley Island, Torres Straits.
