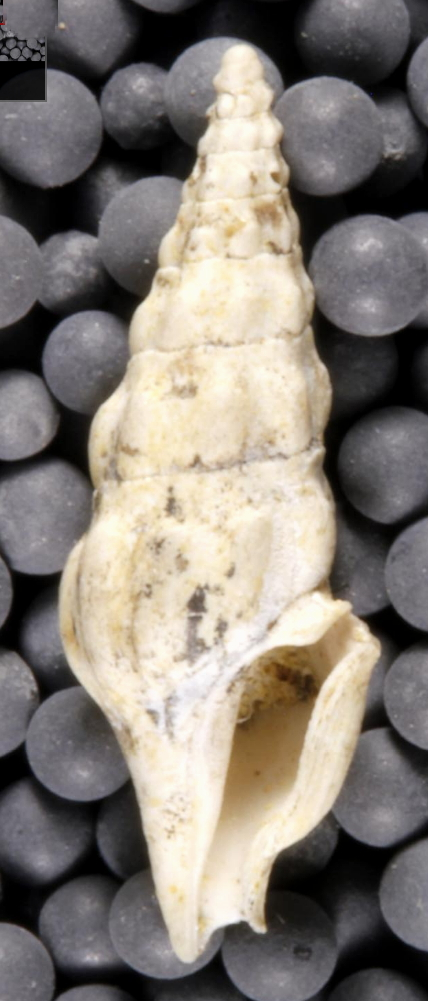
- Shell of † Eumetadrillia serra (holotype at the Smithsonian Institution)

Scientific classification
- Kingdom: Animalia
- Phylum: Mollusca
- Class: Gastropoda
- Subclass: Caenogastropoda
- Order: Neogastropoda
- Superfamily: Conoidea
- Family: Drilliidae
- Genus: †Eumetadrillia; Woodring, 1928

= Eumetadrillia =

Extinct genus of gastropods

Eumetadrillia is a genus of sea snails, marine gastropod mollusks in the family Drilliidae.

== Species ==
Species within the genus Eumetadrillia include:

- † Eumetadrillia acidna Woodring, 1970
- † Eumetadrillia dodona Gardner, 1937
- † Eumetadrillia mauryae Perrilliat, 1973
- † Eumetadrillia rabdotacona. Gardner, 1937
- † Eumetadrillia serra Woodring, 1928
- † Eumetadrillia thalmanni Perrilliat, 1973

All these species are only known from fossils from the Middle Miocene in Central America (Mexico, Panama). An alternate representation is under Agladrillia (Eumetadrillia), which contains also one recent species Agladrillia (Eumetadrillia) fuegiensis (Smith, E.A., 1888)
