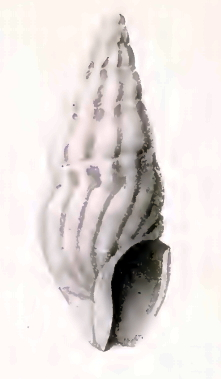
- Original image of a shell of Splendrillia lalage

Scientific classification
- Kingdom: Animalia
- Phylum: Mollusca
- Class: Gastropoda
- Subclass: Caenogastropoda
- Order: Neogastropoda
- Superfamily: Conoidea
- Family: Drilliidae
- Genus: Splendrillia
- Species: S. lalage

Binomial name
- Splendrillia lalage (Dall, 1919)

Synonyms
- Cymatosyrinx lalage Dall, 1919; Elaeocyma baileyi Berry, 1969; Splendrillia baileyi S.S. Berry, 1969

= Splendrillia lalage =

Species of gastropod

Splendrillia lalage is a species of sea snail, a marine gastropod mollusk in the family Drilliidae.

== Description ==
The length of the shell attains 8 mm, its diameter 3 mm.

(Original description) The small, pinkish white shell is polished and acute. It has a smooth protoconch of about two whorls and five subsequent hardly rounded whorls. The spiral sculpture consists of a few obscure threads on the siphonal canal. The suture is obscure and strongly appressed. The anal fasciole is slightly constricted. The axial sculpture consists of (on the penultimate whorl nine) strong rounded ribs most prominent at the periphery, extending from suture to suture, with subequal interspaces, obsolete on the last half of the body whorl and on the base. The incremental linesare irregular and obscure. There is a hump-like varix some distance behind the outer lip. The aperture is narrow. The anal sulcusis conspicuous, rounded, with a heavy subsutural callus. The outer lip is thin with no internal lirae and is moderately produced. The inner lip is callous. The columella is short and thick. The siphonal canal is wide, very short, and hardly differentiated from the aperture.

== Distribution ==
This marine species occurs in the Gulf of California and in Panama Bay
