= Imaclava asaedai =

Scientific classification
- Kingdom: Animalia
- Phylum: Mollusca
- Class: Gastropoda
- Subclass: Caenogastropoda
- Order: Neogastropoda
- Superfamily: Conoidea
- Family: Drilliidae
- Genus: Imaclava
- Species: I. asaedai

Binomial name
- Imaclava asaedai (Hertlein & Strong, 1951)

Synonyms
- Cymatosyrinx asaedai Hertlein & Strong, 1951 (basionym); Drillia (Imaclava) asaedai (Hertlein & Strong, 1951)

Species of gastropod

Imaclava asaedai is a species of sea snail, a marine gastropod mollusk in the family Drilliidae.

== Description ==
The shell grows to a length of 27 mm.

== Distribution ==
This species occurs in the demersal zone of the Pacific Ocean off the Gulf of California, Western Mexico.
