= Inkinga =

Scientific classification
- Kingdom: Animalia
- Phylum: Mollusca
- Class: Gastropoda
- Subclass: Caenogastropoda
- Order: Neogastropoda
- Superfamily: Conoidea
- Family: Horaiclavidae
- Genus: Inkinga; Kilburn, 1988

Type species
- Pleurotoma platystoma E. A. Smith, 1877

Species
- See text

Genus of gastropods

Inkinga is a genus of sea snails, marine gastropod mollusks in the family Horaiclavidae.

It was previously included within the subfamily Crassispirinae, family Turridae.

== Species ==
Species within the genus Inkinga include:

- Inkinga carnosa Kilburn, 2005
- Inkinga cockae (Kilburn, 1977)
- Inkinga platystoma (E. A. Smith, 1877)

Species brought into synonymy

- Inkinga macella J.C. Melvill, 1923: synonym of Inkinga platystoma (E.A. Smith, 1877)
- Inkinga macilenta J.C. Melvill, 1923: synonym of Inkinga platystoma (E.A. Smith, 1877)
- Inkinga ordinaria W.H. Turton, 1932: synonym of Inkinga platystoma (E.A. Smith, 1877)
- Inkinga prolongata W.H. Turton, 1932: synonym of Inkinga platystoma (E.A. Smith, 1877)
- Inkinga wilkiae G.B. Sowerby, 1889: synonym of Inkinga platystoma (E.A. Smith, 1877)
