= Inkinga carnosa =

Scientific classification
- Kingdom: Animalia
- Phylum: Mollusca
- Class: Gastropoda
- Subclass: Caenogastropoda
- Order: Neogastropoda
- Superfamily: Conoidea
- Family: Horaiclavidae
- Genus: Inkinga
- Species: I. carnosa

Binomial name
- Inkinga carnosa Kilburn, 2005

Species of gastropod

Inkinga carnosa is a species of small sea snail, a marine gastropod mollusk in the family Horaiclavidae.

== Distribution ==
This marine species occurs off South Africa.
