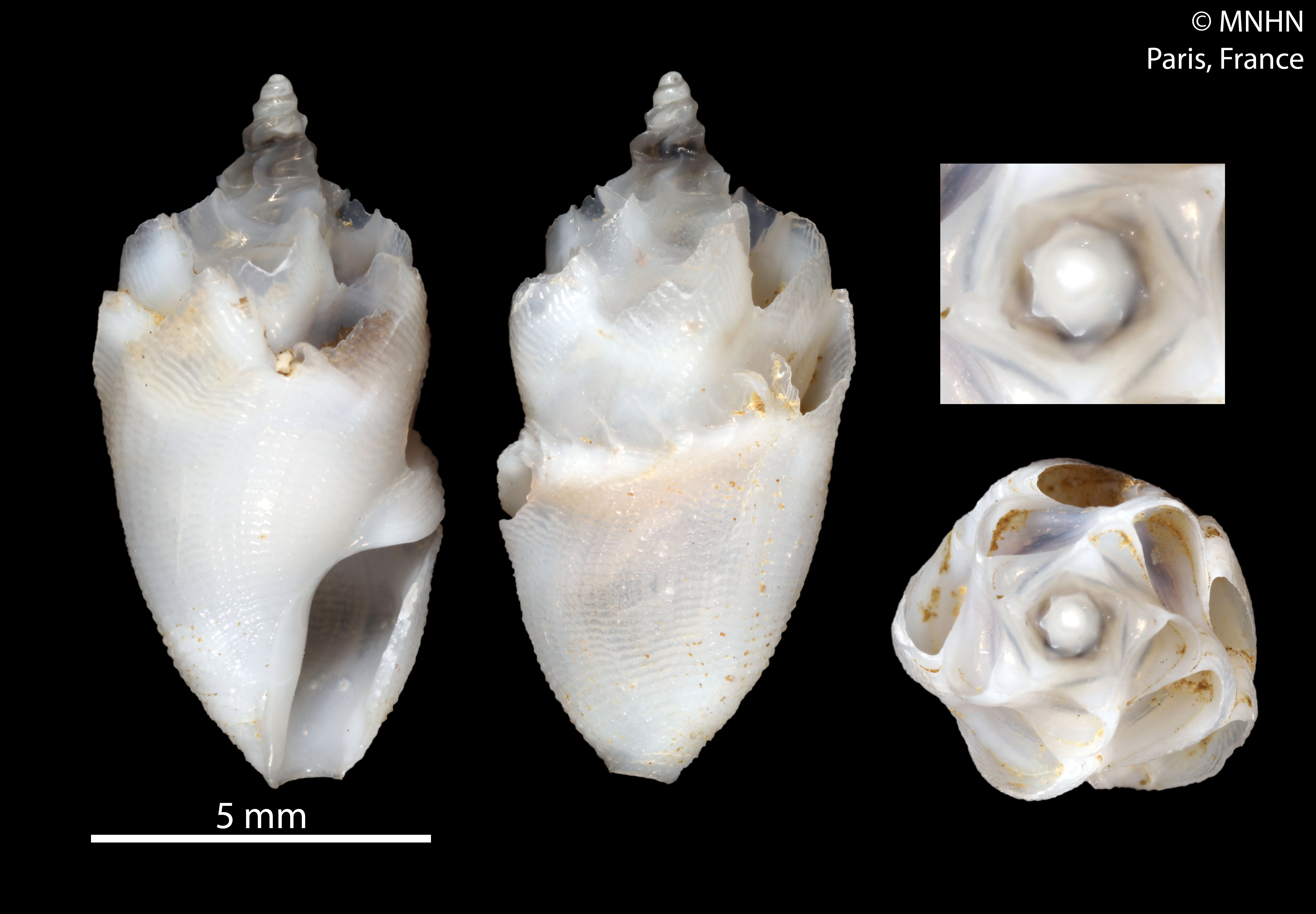
- Shell of Conopleura latiaxisa

Scientific classification
- Kingdom: Animalia
- Phylum: Mollusca
- Class: Gastropoda
- Subclass: Caenogastropoda
- Order: Neogastropoda
- Superfamily: Conoidea
- Family: Drilliidae
- Genus: Conopleura; Hinds, 1844

Type species
- Conopleura striata Hinds, 1844

Species
- See text

= Conopleura =

Genus of gastropods

Conopleura is a genus of sea snails, marine gastropod mollusks in the family Drilliidae.

== Distribution ==
These species are known from the Central Indo-Pacific.

== Species ==
Species within the genus Conopleura include:

- Conopleura latiaxisa Chino, 2011
- Conopleura striata Hinds, 1844

Species brought into synonymy

- Conopleura aliena Smriglio, Mariottini & Calascibetta, 1999: synonym of Tritia lima (Dillwyn, 1817)
