= Imaclava hotei =

Scientific classification
- Kingdom: Animalia
- Phylum: Mollusca
- Class: Gastropoda
- Subclass: Caenogastropoda
- Order: Neogastropoda
- Superfamily: Conoidea
- Family: Drilliidae
- Genus: Imaclava
- Species: I. hotei

Binomial name
- Imaclava hotei (Otuka, 1949)

Synonyms
- Clavus hotei (Otuka, 1949); Clinura hotei (Otuka, 1949); Cymatosyrinx hotei Otuka, 1949 (basionym); Imaclava hotei (Otuka, 1949)

Species of gastropod

Imaclava hotei is a species of sea snail, a marine gastropod mollusk in the family Drilliidae.

== Distribution ==
This species occurs in the demersal zone of the Northwest Pacific Ocean off Japan.
