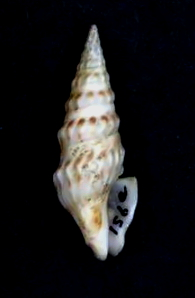
- Imaclava unimaculata shel

Scientific classification
- Kingdom: Animalia
- Phylum: Mollusca
- Class: Gastropoda
- Subclass: Caenogastropoda
- Order: Neogastropoda
- Superfamily: Conoidea
- Family: Drilliidae
- Genus: Imaclava; Bartsch, 1944

Type species
- Imaclava ima Bartsch, 1944

= Imaclava =

Genus of gastropods

Imaclava is a genus of sea snails, marine gastropod mollusks in the family Drilliidae.

== Species ==
Species within the genus Imaclava include:

- Imaclava asaedai (Hertlein & Strong, 1951)
- Imaclava hotei (Otuka, 1949)
- Imaclava ima Bartsch, 1944
- Imaclava pilsbryi Bartsch, 1950
- Imaclava unimaculata (Sowerby I, 1834)

Species brought into synonymy

- Imaclava hosoi Okutani, 1964: synonym of Crassispira hosoi (Okutani, 1964)
- Imaclava pembertoni (H.N. Lowe, 1935): synonym of Imaclava unimaculata (Sowerby I, 1834)
