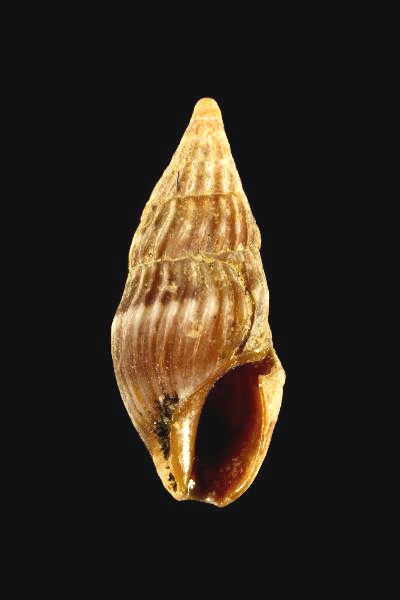
- Crassopleura maravignae

Scientific classification
- Kingdom: Animalia
- Phylum: Mollusca
- Class: Gastropoda
- Subclass: Caenogastropoda
- Order: Neogastropoda
- Superfamily: Conoidea
- Family: Drilliidae
- Genus: Crassopleura; Monterosato, 1884

Type species
- Pleurotoma maravignae Bivona Ant. in Bivona And., 1838

Species
- See text

= Crassopleura =

Genus of gastropods

Crassopleura is a genus of sea snails, marine gastropod mollusks in the family Drilliidae.

== Species ==
Species within the genus Crassopleura include:

- Crassopleura maravignae (Bivona Ant. in Bivona And., 1838)

Species brought into synonymy

- † Crassopleura incrassata (Dujardin, 1837): synonym of Crassopleura maravignae (Bivona Ant. in Bivona And., 1838)
