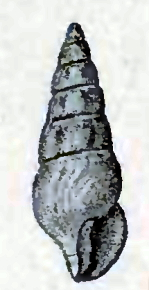
- Drawing of a shell of Globidrillia hemphillii

Scientific classification
- Kingdom: Animalia
- Phylum: Mollusca
- Class: Gastropoda
- Subclass: Caenogastropoda
- Order: Neogastropoda
- Superfamily: Conoidea
- Family: Drilliidae
- Genus: Globidrillia
- Species: G. hemphillii

Binomial name
- Globidrillia hemphillii (Stearns, 1871)

Synonyms
- Clavus hemphillii (Stearns, 1871); Clavus (Cymatosyrinx) hemphillii (Stearns, 1871); Cymatosyrinx hemphilli (Stearns, 1871); Cymatosyrinx (Elaeocyma) hemphillii (Stearns, 1871); Drillia hemphillii (Stearns, 1871); Pleurotoma hemphillii Stearns, 1871; Pleurotoma (Drillia) hemphillii Stearns, 1871

= Globidrillia hemphillii =

Species of gastropod

Globidrillia hemphillii is a species of sea snail, a marine gastropod mollusk in the family Drilliidae.

== Description ==
The small, slender, polished shell has a long spire and a short aperture terminating in a short, broad, open siphonal canal. It is horn-colored. There are inconspicuous longitudinal ribs on the spire, which are obsolete on the body whorl,. The sutural line is impressed. (described as Drillia hemphillii)

== Distribution ==
This species occurs in the demersal zone of the Pacific Ocean off Lower California.
