= Acinodrillia =

Scientific classification
- Kingdom: Animalia
- Phylum: Mollusca
- Class: Gastropoda
- Subclass: Caenogastropoda
- Order: Neogastropoda
- Superfamily: Conoidea
- Family: Drilliidae
- Genus: Acinodrillia; Kilburn, 1988

Type species
- Acinodrillia viscum Kilburn, 1988

Species
- See text

Genus of gastropods

Acinodrillia is a genus of sea snails, marine gastropod mollusks in the family Drilliidae.

== Description ==
The length of the claviform shell varies between 7mm and 12 mm. The spiral sculpture of the shell shows sharply incised grooves, carving through the axial ribs into distinct nodules or granules. These axial ribs disappear below the suture. Contrary to the species in Drillia, the anal sinus is not spout-like. Contrary to Agladrillia, the outer lip is not pinched in toward the base of the shell. The body whorl shows a dorsal varix (a subcylíndrical protrusion). The wide siphonal canal is unnotched.

== Distribution ==
This marine genus is endemic to South Africa.

== Species ==
Species within the genus Acinodrillia include:

- Acinodrillia amazimba Kilburn, 1988
- Acinodrillia paula (Thiele, 1925)
- Acinodrillia viscum Kilburn, 1988
