= Leptadrillia elissa =

Scientific classification
- Kingdom: Animalia
- Phylum: Mollusca
- Class: Gastropoda
- Subclass: Caenogastropoda
- Order: Neogastropoda
- Superfamily: Conoidea
- Family: Drilliidae
- Genus: Leptadrillia
- Species: L. elissa

Binomial name
- Leptadrillia elissa (Dall, 1919)

Synonyms
- Clavus (Cymatosyrinx) elissa (Dall, 1919); Cymatosyrinx elissa Dall, 1919 (basionym)

Species of gastropod

Leptadrillia elissa is a species of sea snail, a marine gastropod mollusk in the family Drilliidae.

== Distribution ==
This species occurs in the demersal zone of the Eastern Pacific Ocean off Panama and the Magellan Strait
