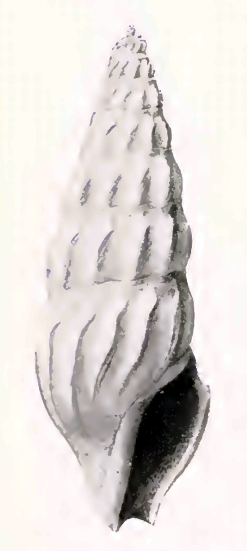
- Original image of a shell of Globidrillia ferminiana

Scientific classification
- Kingdom: Animalia
- Phylum: Mollusca
- Class: Gastropoda
- Subclass: Caenogastropoda
- Order: Neogastropoda
- Superfamily: Conoidea
- Family: Drilliidae
- Genus: Globidrillia
- Species: G. ferminiana

Binomial name
- Globidrillia ferminiana (Dall, 1919)

Synonyms
- Clavus (Cymatosyrinx) hemphillii (Stearns, 1871); Cymatosyrinx ferminiana Dall, 1919 (original description)

= Globidrillia ferminiana =

Species of gastropod

Globidrillia ferminiana is a species of sea snail, a marine gastropod mollusk in the family Drilliidae.

== Description ==
The shell grows to a length of 14 mm, its diameter 5 mm.

(Original description) The shell is white, with a yellowish base. It is slender, acute, with a swollen smooth white protoconch of about two whorls and six subsequent whorls. The suture is appressed. On the earlier whorls the posterior edge is prominent. The whorls are moderately rounded. The spiral sculpture is absent from the spire, on the body whorl hardly visible except on the extreme anterior base and the siphonal fasciole where there are a few impressed lines. The axial sculpture of (on the body whorl 12) consists of somewhat sigmoid ribs, feebly arcuate on the anal fasciole, strongest in front of it, rather sharp-edged, extending mostly over the base, and with somewhat wider interspaces. They are not continuous up the spire. The aperture is rather narrow. The anal sulcus is conspicuous, with a subsutural callus. The outer lip is thin, sharp, with a ribless space and a small varix behind it, smooth internally. The inner lip and columella are callous and smooth. The siphonal canal is distinct, small, narrow, short, somewhat recurved, with an evident siphonal fasciole.

== Distribution ==
This species occurs in the demersal zone of the Pacific Ocean off lower California and the Gulf of California, Western Mexico
