= Sedilia (gastropod) =

Scientific classification
- Kingdom: Animalia
- Phylum: Mollusca
- Class: Gastropoda
- Subclass: Caenogastropoda
- Order: Neogastropoda
- Superfamily: Conoidea
- Family: Drilliidae
- Genus: Sedilia; Fargo, 1953

Type species
- † Drillia sedilia Dall, 1890

Species
- See text

Genus of gastropods

Sedilia is a genus of sea snails, marine gastropod mollusks in the family Drilliidae.

== Species ==
Species within the genus Sedilia include:

- † Sedilia aphanitoma Dall 1892
- Sedilia compacta Faber, 2011
- † Sedilia sedilia (Dall, 1890)

Species brought into synonymy

- Sedilia melanacme (E. A. Smith, 1882): synonym of Buchema melanacme (E. A. Smith, 1882)
