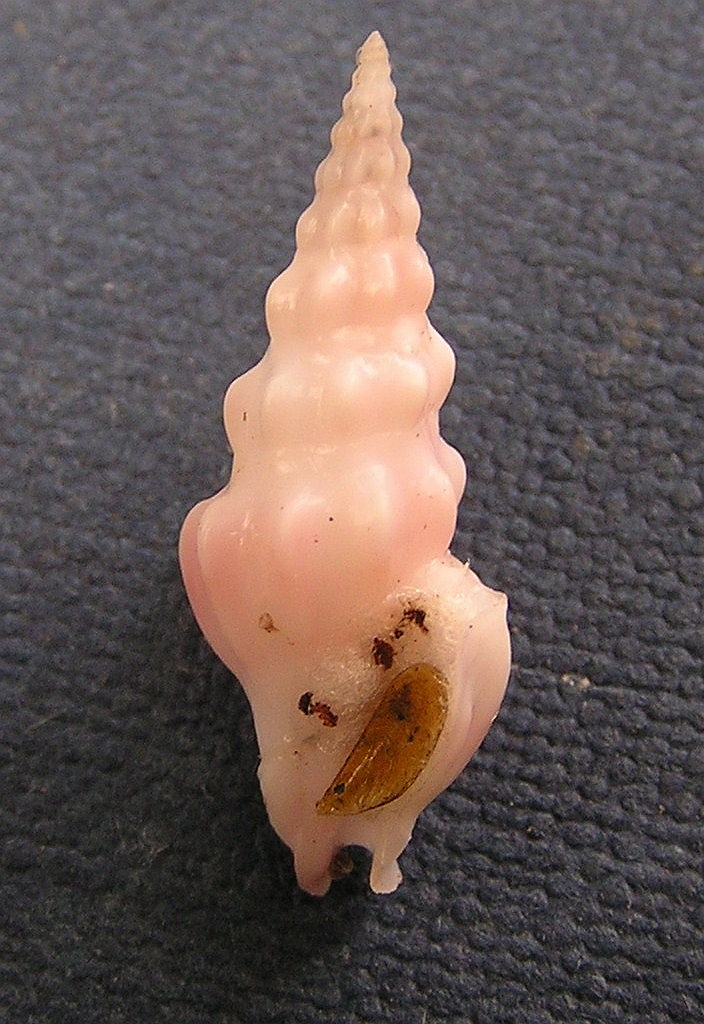
- Apertural view of a shell of Drillia roseola

Scientific classification
- Kingdom: Animalia
- Phylum: Mollusca
- Class: Gastropoda
- Subclass: Caenogastropoda
- Order: Neogastropoda
- Superfamily: Conoidea
- Family: Drilliidae
- Genus: Drillia
- Species: D. roseola

Binomial name
- Drillia roseola (Hertlein & Strong, 1955)

Synonyms
- Clavus roseola Parker, 1964; Clavus (Cymatosyrinx) roseola Parker, 1964; Cymatosyrinx roseola Hertlein & Strong, 1955; Drillia rosea (Sowerby, G.B. I, 1834); Pleurotoma rosea Sowerby, G.B. I, 1834

= Drillia roseola =

Species of gastropod

Drillia roseola is a species of sea snail, a marine gastropod mollusk in the family Drilliidae.

== Description ==
The size of an adult shell varies between 15 mm and 31 mm.

== Distribution ==
This species occurs in the demersal zone of the tropical Eastern Pacific Ocean from Mexico to Ecuador.
