= Inkinga cockae =

Scientific classification
- Kingdom: Animalia
- Phylum: Mollusca
- Class: Gastropoda
- Subclass: Caenogastropoda
- Order: Neogastropoda
- Superfamily: Conoidea
- Family: Horaiclavidae
- Genus: Inkinga
- Species: I. cockae

Binomial name
- Inkinga cockae (Kilburn, 1977)

Synonyms
- Paracuneus cockae Kilburn, 1977

Species of gastropod

Inkinga cockae is a species of small sea snail, a marine gastropod mollusk in the family Horaiclavidae.

== Description ==
The length of the shell attains 10 mm.

== Distribution ==
This marine species occurs off False Bay, Southern KwaZulu-Natal, South Africa.
