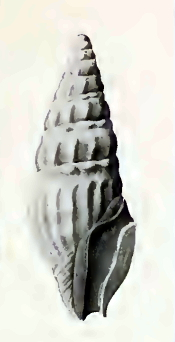
- Wairarapa duplaris

Scientific classification
- Kingdom: Animalia
- Phylum: Mollusca
- Class: Gastropoda
- Subclass: Caenogastropoda
- Order: Neogastropoda
- Superfamily: Conoidea
- Family: Drilliidae
- Genus: Wairarapa; Vella, 1954

Type species
- † Wairarapa rebecca Vella, 1954

Species
- See text

= Wairarapa (gastropod) =

Genus of gastropods

Wairarapa is a genus of sea snails, marine gastropod mollusks in the family Drilliidae.

== Description ==
This genus was proposed by Vella in 1954 for species resembling Splendrillia, but having a different protoconch, another subsutural fold and showing a stromboid notch.

== Distribution ==
The species type of this genus is extinct and was endemic to New Zealand. W. duplaris occurs off North Australia to Queensland, Australia.

== Species ==
- Wairarapa duplaris (Hedley, 1922)
- † Wairarapa rebecca Vella, 1954
