= Inkinga platystoma =

Scientific classification
- Kingdom: Animalia
- Phylum: Mollusca
- Class: Gastropoda
- Subclass: Caenogastropoda
- Order: Neogastropoda
- Superfamily: Conoidea
- Family: Horaiclavidae
- Genus: Inkinga
- Species: I. platystoma

Binomial name
- Inkinga platystoma (E.A. Smith, 1877)

Synonyms
- Clavatula (Clionella) platystoma (E.A. Smith, 1877); Clionella platystoma (E.A. Smith, 1877); Drillia ordinaria W. H. Turton, 1932 (junior synonym); Drillia platystoma (E.A. Smith, 1877); Drillia prolongata W. H. Turton, 1932 (junior synonym); Inkinga macella J.C. Melvill, 1923; Inkinga macilenta J.C. Melvill, 1923; Inkinga ordinaria W.H. Turton, 1932; Inkinga prolongata W.H. Turton, 1932; Inkinga wilkiae G.B. Sowerby, 1889; Paracuneus platystoma (E. A. Smith, 1877); Pleurotoma (Clionella) platystoma E.A. Smith, 1877 (basionym)

Species of gastropod

Inkinga platystoma is a species of sea snail, a marine gastropod mollusk in the family Horaiclavidae.

== Description ==
The length of the shell attains 13 mm, and its diameter is 5 mm.

The elongate, turreted shell contains 7 whorls. The two apical whorls are remarkably large. The faint nodules at the top of the whorls and the more distinct ones around the middle have faint dots of brown between them. The spiral striae are interrupted by these. The aperture is large and almost square. It equals about 5/13 of the total length of the shell. The sinus is large and moderately deep. The siphonal canal is open and very short.

== Distribution ==
This species occurs in the demersal zone off the Cape of Good Hope to Eastern Transkei, South Africa.
