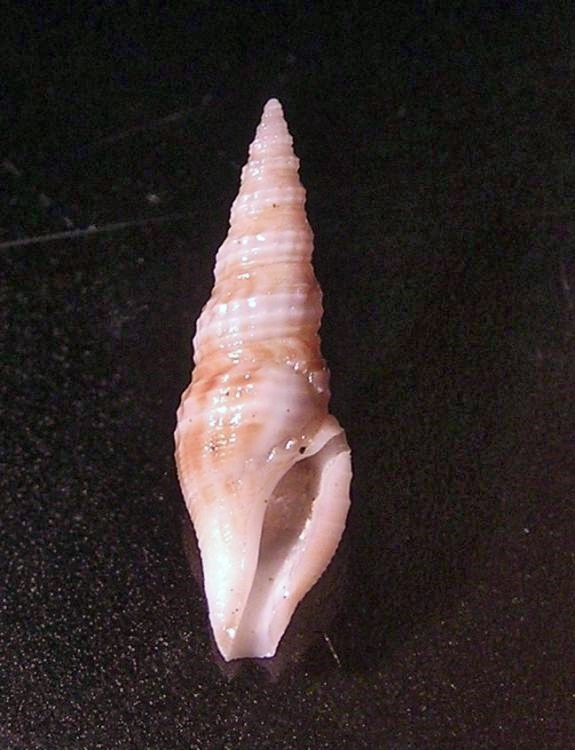
- An apertural view of a shell of Cymatosyrinx parciplicata

Scientific classification
- Kingdom: Animalia
- Phylum: Mollusca
- Class: Gastropoda
- Subclass: Caenogastropoda
- Order: Neogastropoda
- Superfamily: Conoidea
- Family: Drilliidae; Olsson, 1964

Genera
- See text

Synonyms
- Clavidae Casey, 1904 (non McCrady, 1859: preoccupied)

= Drilliidae =

Family of gastropods

The Drilliidae are a taxonomic family of small predatory sea snails with high-spired shells. They are classified as marine gastropod mollusks in the superfamily Conoidea.

This family has no subfamilies. It consists of about 30 genera and approximately 500 recent species.

== Description ==
The shell is claviform with a tall spire, or squatly conical to biconical. In many species, the siphonal canal is truncated. The aperture is U-shaped with a parietal callus pad.

The sculpture of the shell shows prominent axial ribs with a polished surface. Most species have a dorsal varix (transverse elevation), except in the genera Cymatosyrinx, Elaeocyma and Splendrillia. The protoconch can be smooth or very carinate. The ovate operculum has a terminal nucleus.

The radula of the species in this family have characteristically five teeth in each row (formula: 1 + 1 + 1 + 1 + 1) with a vestigial central tooth, comb-like lateral teeth and a pair of flat-pointed, slender marginal teeth.

The foregut structure of the anterior alimentary system has the least derived foregut anatomy of all the families in the superfamily Conoidea.

== Distribution ==
This family has wide distribution, ranging from Iceland to the Antarctic Ocean, found at intertidal to abyssal depths. This is reflected in the variability in larval shells and the size of the shell (from a few millimetres to 6 cm) and the characteristics of the protoconch and the teleoconch.

== Taxonomic history ==
The genera in this family were originally separated from the subfamily Clavitulinae and classified by H.& A. Adams (1858) under subfamily Turritinae, because their operculum has a terminal instead of a central nucleus. In 1942, the species with a U-shaped sinus and a parietal callus pad were brought by Powell in the new subfamily Clavinae. In 1966, Morrison proposed the subfamily Drillinae (= Clavinae) for the species with a stenoglossan radula with comb-like lateral teeth. Finally, in 1993, Taylor et al. proposed the promotion of Drillinae from subfamily to the family level Drilliidae.

== Taxonomy ==
Genera in the family Drilliidae include:

- Acinodrillia Kilburn, 1988
- Agladrillia Woodring, 1928
- Bellaspira Conrad, 1868
- Calliclava McLean, 1971
- Cerodrillia Bartsch & Rehder, 1939
- Clathrodrillia Dall, 1918
- Clavus Montfort, 1810
- Conopleura Hinds, 1844
- Crassopleura Monterosato, 1884
- Cruziturricula Marks, 1951
- Cymatosyrinx Dall, 1889
- Decoradrillia Fallon, 2016
- Douglassia Bartsch, 1934
- Drillia Gray, 1838
- Elaeocyma Dall, 1918
- Eumetadrillia Woodring, 1928
- Fenimorea Bartsch, 1934
- Fusiturricula Woodring, 1928
- Globidrillia Woodring, 1928
- Hauturua Powell, 1942
- Imaclava Bartsch, 1944
- Iredalea Oliver, 1915
- Kylix Dall, 1919
- Leptadrillia Woodring, 1928
- Lissodrillia Bartsch & Rehder, 1943
- Neodrillia Bartsch, 1943
- Orrmaesia Kilburn, 1988
- Paracuneus Laseron, 1954
- Plagiostropha Melvill, 1927
- † Pleurofusia de Gregorio, 1890
- Sedilia Fargo, 1953
- Spirotropis Sars, 1878
- Splendrillia Hedley, 1922
- Stenodrillia Korobkov, 1955
- Syntomodrillia Hedley, 1922
- Wairarapa Vella, 1954

Genera brought into synonymy

- Brephodrillia Pilsbry & Lowe, 1932: synonym of Iredalea
- Clavicantha Swainson, 1840: synonym of Clavus Montfort, 1810
- Eldridgea Bartsch, 1934: synonym of Clavus Montfort, 1810
- Fusisyrinx Bartsch, 1934: synonym of Fusiturricula Woodring, 1928
- Tylotia Melvill, 1917: synonym of Clavus Montfort, 1810
- Tylotiella Habe, 1958: synonym of Clavus Montfort, 1810

Genera moved to other families

- Austroclavus (unassigned to a family within Conoidea)
- Brachytoma moved to the family Pseudomelatomidae
- Sediliopsis Petuch, 1988: moved to the family Pseudomelatomidae
