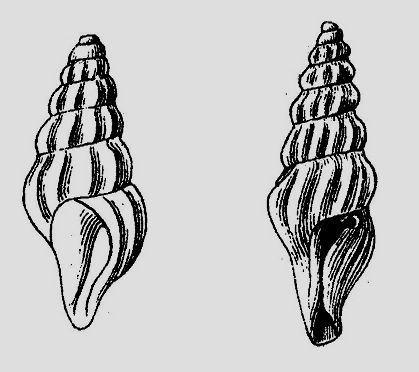
- Original image of a shell of Syntomodrillia lissotropis

Scientific classification
- Kingdom: Animalia
- Phylum: Mollusca
- Class: Gastropoda
- Subclass: Caenogastropoda
- Order: Neogastropoda
- Superfamily: Conoidea
- Family: Drilliidae
- Genus: Syntomodrillia; Woodring, 1928

Type species
- Pleurotoma lissotropis Dall, 1881

Species
- See text

= Syntomodrillia =

Genus of gastropods

Syntomodrillia is a genus of sea snails, marine gastropod mollusks in the family Drilliidae.

== Species ==
Species within the genus Syntomodrillia include:

- † Syntomodrillia atsutaensis (MacNeil, 1961)
- Syntomodrillia bermudensis Fallon, 2016
- † Syntomodrillia biconica Weisbord, 1962
- Syntomodrillia carolinae Bartsch, 1934
- † Syntomodrillia circinata Powell, 1944
- † Syntomodrillia collarubra MacNeil, 1984
- Syntomodrillia cookei (E. A. Smith, 1888)
- Syntomodrillia curacaoensis Fallon, 2016
- † Syntomodrillia decemcostata (Ludbrook, 1941)
- Syntomodrillia floridana Fallon, 2016
- Syntomodrillia fragilata Wiedrick, 2025
- † Syntomodrillia funis MacNeil, 1984
- Syntomodrillia harasewychi Fallon, 2016
- Syntomodrillia hemmesjazwinskiorum Wiedrick, 2025
- Syntomodrillia hesperia Fallon, 2016
- Syntomodrillia hypsela (R.B. Watson, 1881)
- † Syntomodrillia inadrina Mansfield 1925
- † Syntomodrillia iphis Woodring 1928
- Syntomodrillia lissotropis (Dall, 1881)
- † Syntomodrillia ludbrookae Powell, 1944
- Syntomodrillia lyra Fallon, 2016
- Syntomodrillia mellea Fallon, 2016
- Syntomodrillia nenia (Hedley, 1903)
- † Syntomodrillia obsoleta Powell, 1944
- Syntomodrillia peggywilliamsae Fallon, 2016
- Syntomodrillia portoricana Fallon, 2016
- Syntomodrillia pusilla Fallon, 2016
- † Syntomodrillia sandleroides (Tenison Woods, 1877)
- Syntomodrillia socolatea Fallon, 2016
- Syntomodrillia stahlschmidti Fallon, 2016
- † Syntomodrillia tantula (Conrad, 1848)
- Syntomodrillia triangulos Fallon, 2016
- Syntomodrillia trinidadensis Fallon, 2016
- † Syntomodrillia venusta Powell, 1944
- Syntomodrillia vitrea McLean & Poorman, 1971
- † Syntomodrillia waiauensis Powell, 1942
- Syntomodrillia woodringi Bartsch, 1934

Species brought into synonymy

- † Syntomodrillia complexa A. W. B. Powell, 1944: synonym of Syntomodrillia venusta A. W. B. Powell, 1944
- † Syntomodrillia compta A. W. B. Powell, 1944: synonym of Syntomodrillia venusta A. W. B. Powell, 1944
- † Syntomodrillia espyra Woodring, 1928: synonym of Splendrillia espyra (Woodring, 1928)
- † Syntomodrillia exuta A. W. B. Powell, 1944: synonym of Hauturua exuta (A. W. B. Powell, 1944)
- Syntomodrillia simpsoni (Simpson, 1886): synonym of Lissodrillia simpsoni(Simpson, 1886)
- Syntomodrillia tantula Bartsch, 1934: synonym of Syntomodrillia portoricana Fallon, 2016
- † Syntomodrillia vivens A. W. B. Powell, 1942: synonym of Hauturua vivens (A. W. B. Powell, 1942)
