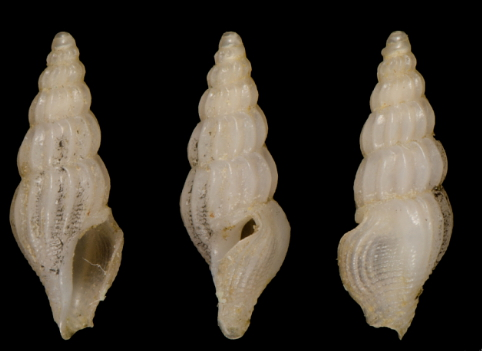
- Shell of Syntomodrillia carolinae (holotype at the Smithsonian Institution)

Scientific classification
- Kingdom: Animalia
- Phylum: Mollusca
- Class: Gastropoda
- Subclass: Caenogastropoda
- Order: Neogastropoda
- Superfamily: Conoidea
- Family: Drilliidae
- Genus: Syntomodrillia
- Species: S. carolinae

Binomial name
- Syntomodrillia carolinae (P. Bartsch, 1934)

Synonyms
- Splendrillia carolinae Bartsch, 1934

= Syntomodrillia carolinae =

Species of gastropod

Syntomodrillia carolinae is a species of sea snail, a marine gastropod mollusk in the family Drilliidae.

It is closely related to Syntomadrillia woodringi, differing in that it has slenderer nuclear whorls and fewer, stouter spiral cords on the columella.

== Description ==
The length of the shell varies between 6 mm and 10 mm. The shell is white with a pinkish tint, and is elongate comic in shape.

== Distribution ==
This marine species occurs in the Caribbean Sea, of the Antilles (Guadeloupe) and Southern Brazil at depths between 219 m and 293 m.
