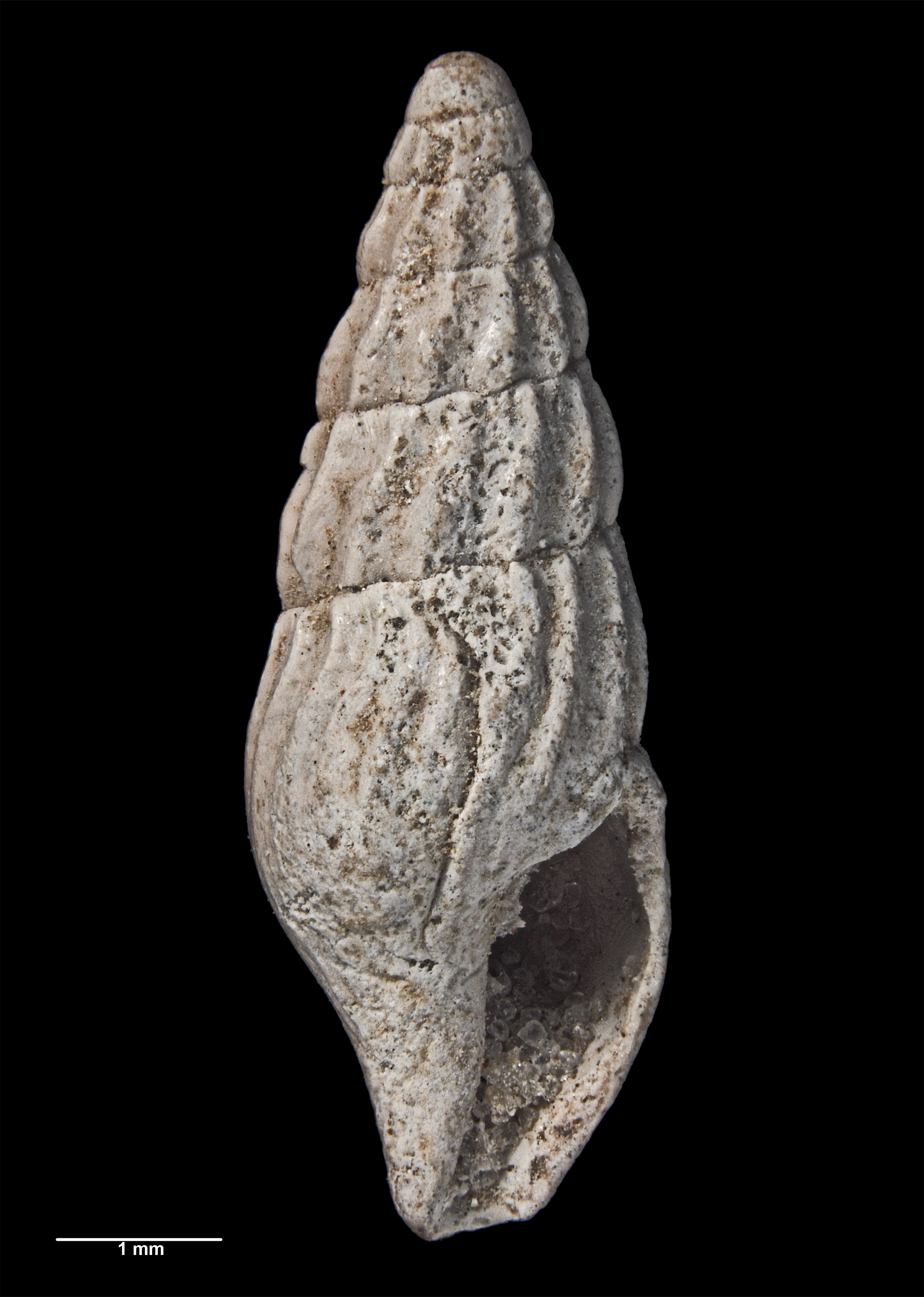
- Holotype from Auckland War Memorial Museum

Scientific classification
- Kingdom: Animalia
- Phylum: Mollusca
- Class: Gastropoda
- Subclass: Caenogastropoda
- Order: Neogastropoda
- Family: Drilliidae
- Genus: Syntomodrillia
- Species: †S. ludbrookae

Binomial name
- †Syntomodrillia ludbrookae Powell, 1944

= Syntomodrillia ludbrookae =

Syntomodrillia ludbrookae Temporal range: middle Miocene

Extinct species of gastropod

Syntomodrillia ludbrookae is an extinct species of sea snail, a marine gastropod mollusc in the family Drilliidae. Fossils of the species date to the middle Miocene, and have been found in the strata of the St Vincent Basin of South Australia.

== Description ==
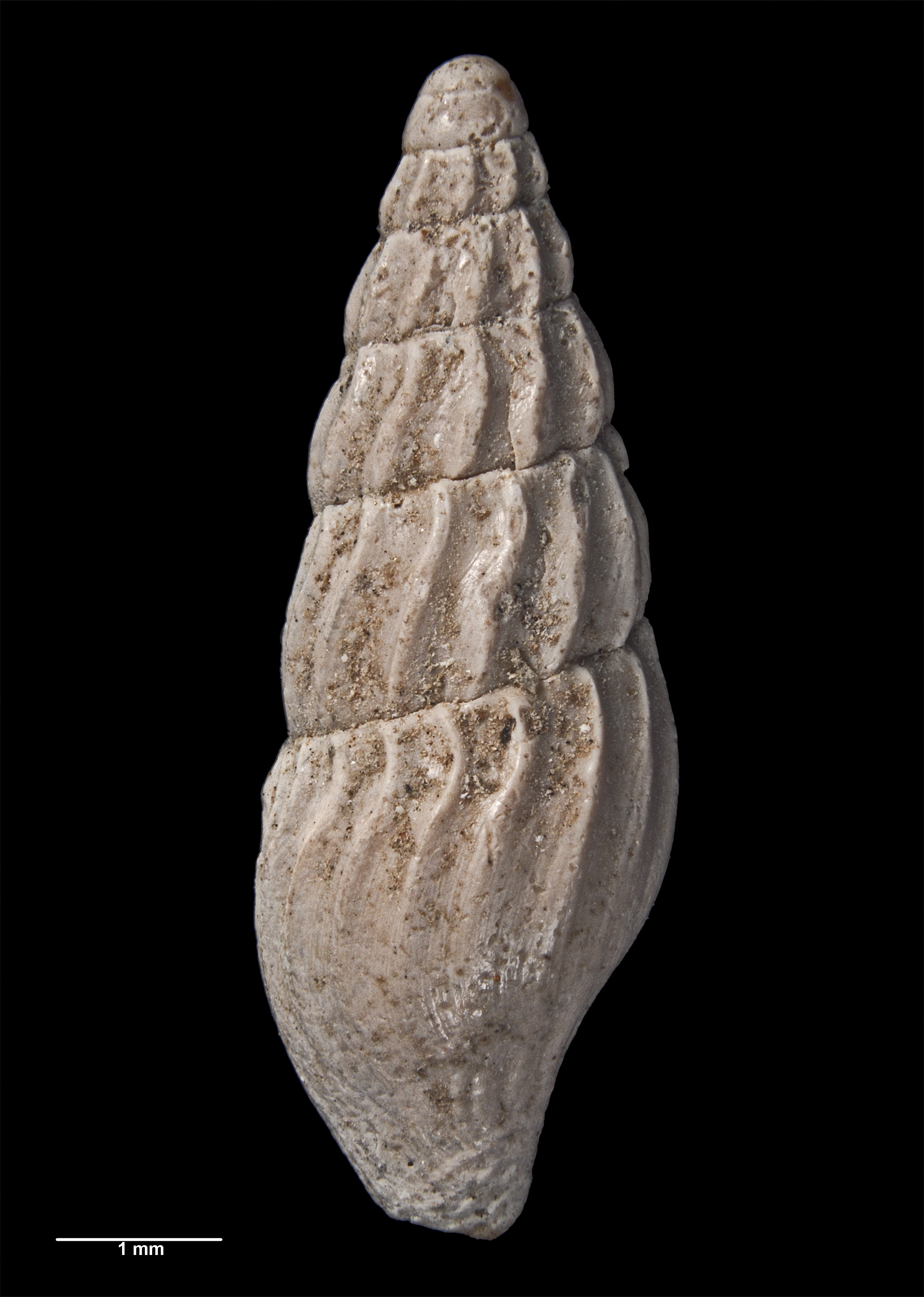
Reverse view of holotype

In the original description, Powell described the species as follows:

Whorls very lightly convex, peripheral angle scarcely apparent, defined only by a slight thickening of the axials at about the middle. Axials narrow-crested, oblique, flexuous over body-whorl, fading out on middle of base, 15-16 per whorl. Anterior end with 5 distinct spiral threads.

The holotype of the species measures 7 mm (0.28 in) in height and 2.7 mm (0.11 in) in diameter. It has a similar appearance to Tylotiella falcicosta found in KwaZulu-Natal, South Africa, but has a slightly more narrow shell.

== Taxonomy ==
The species was first described by A.W.B. Powell in 1944. The holotype was collected from the Metropolitan Abattoirs Bore in Adelaide, Australia, at a depth of 122–152 m (400–499 ft) in 1919 by Walter Howchin and Joseph Verco, and is held by the Auckland War Memorial Museum.

== Distribution ==
This extinct marine species dates to the middle Miocene, and occurs in the strata of the St Vincent Basin of South Australia, found in the Dry Creek Sands.
