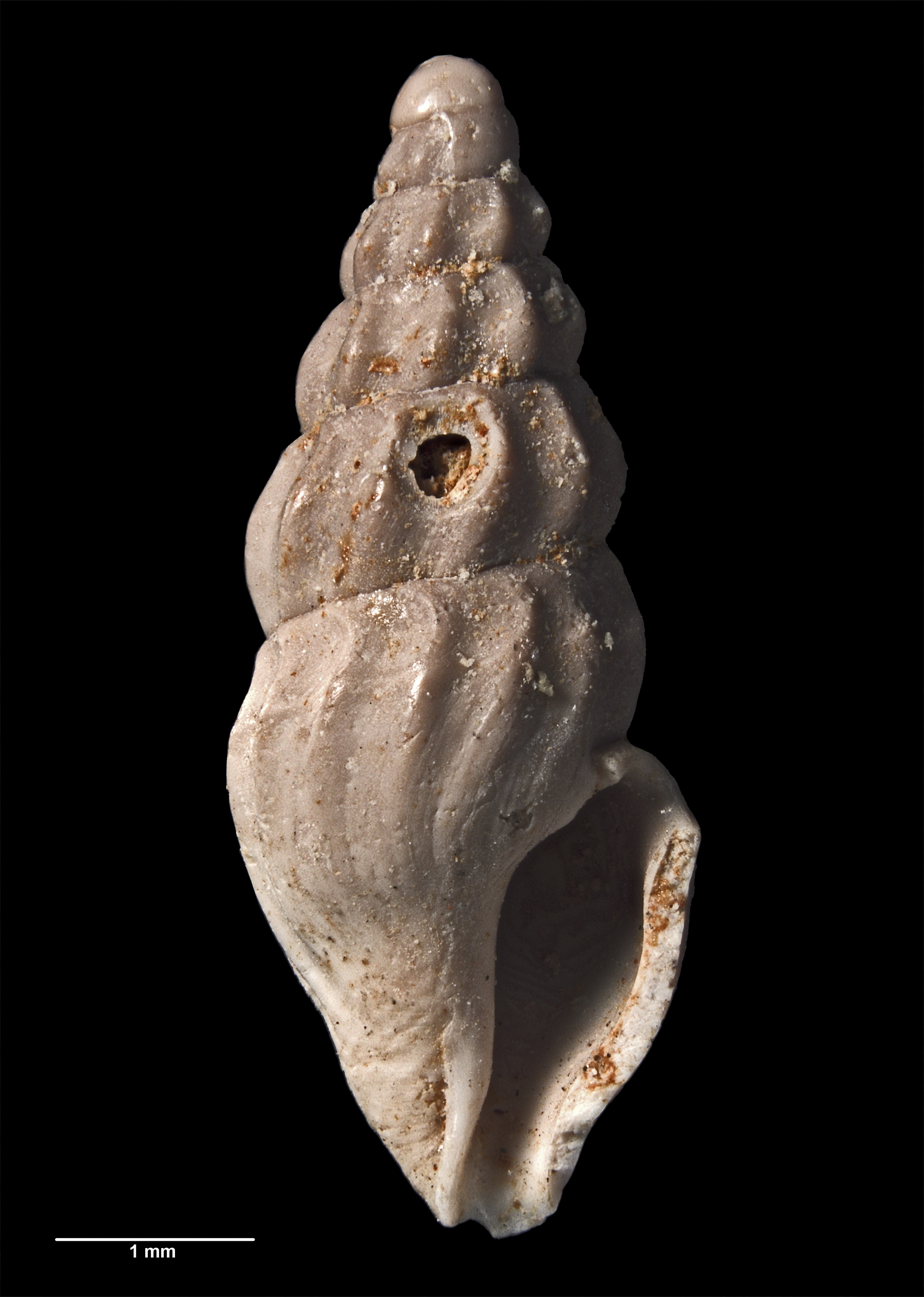
- Holotype from Auckland War Memorial Museum

Scientific classification
- Kingdom: Animalia
- Phylum: Mollusca
- Class: Gastropoda
- Subclass: Caenogastropoda
- Order: Neogastropoda
- Family: Drilliidae
- Genus: Syntomodrillia
- Species: †S. circinata

Binomial name
- †Syntomodrillia circinata Powell, 1944

= Syntomodrillia circinata =

Syntomodrillia circinata Temporal range: late Oligocene–early Miocene

Extinct species of gastropod

Syntomodrillia circinata is an extinct species of sea snail, a marine gastropod mollusc in the family Drilliidae. Fossils of the species have been found in strata of the Port Phillip Basin of Victoria, and date to either the late Oligocene or the early Miocene.

== Description ==
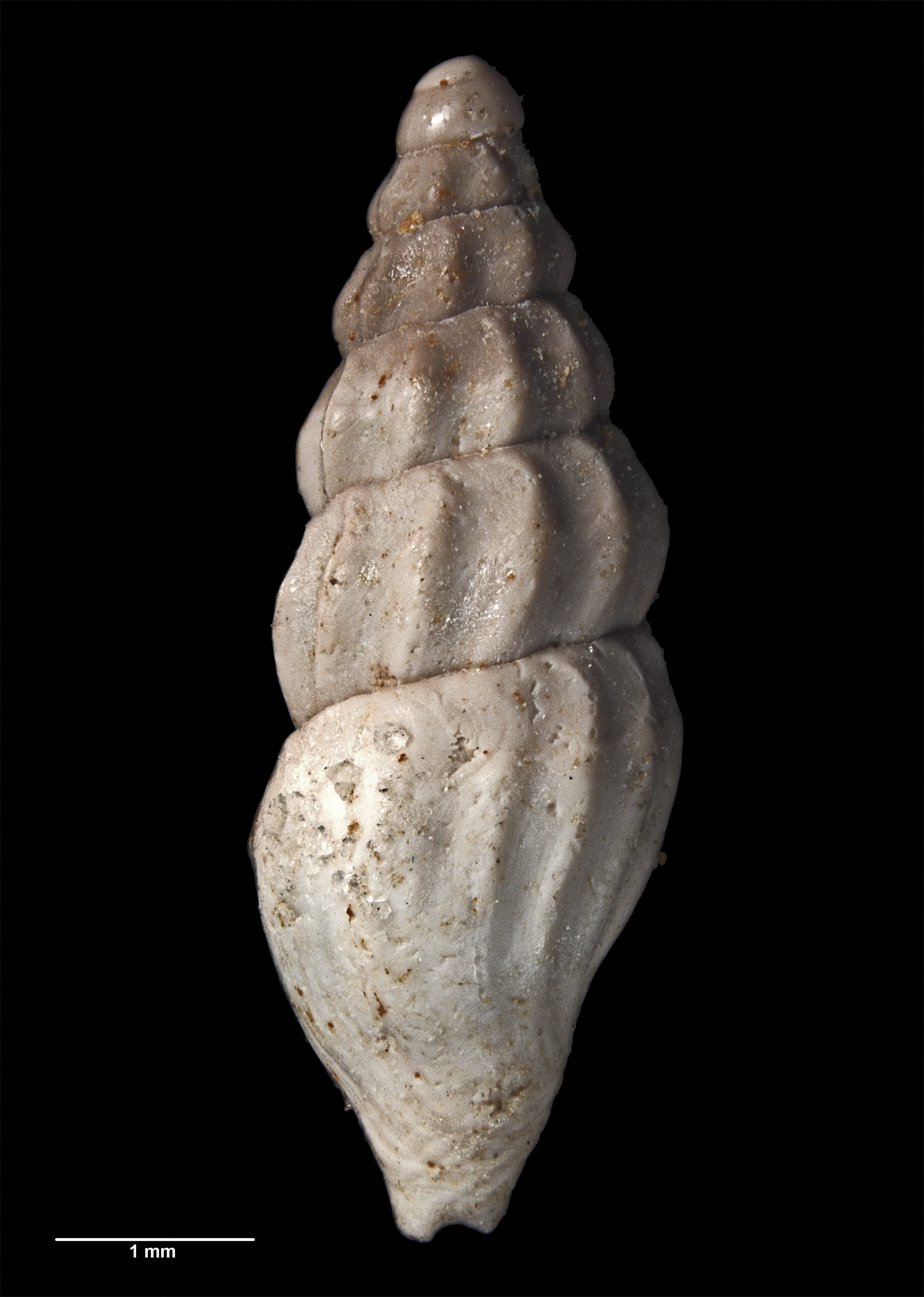
Reverse view of holotype

In the original description, Powell described the species as follows:

Species very similar to obsoleta, but much larger, axials more erect, and connected across the shoulder-angle by a weak thread; five moderately strong spirals on the neck. Axials 11 per whorl.

The holotype of the species measures 6 mm (0.24 in) in height and 2.5 mm (0.098 in) in diameter.

== Taxonomy ==
The species was first described by A.W.B. Powell in 1944. The holotype was collected from Torquay, Victoria at an unknown date prior to 1944, and is held by the Auckland War Memorial Museum.

== Distribution ==
This extinct marine species dates to either the late Oligocene or the early Miocene, and occurs in the strata of the Port Phillip Basin of Victoria, Australia, either the Jan Juc Formation or the Puebla Formation.
