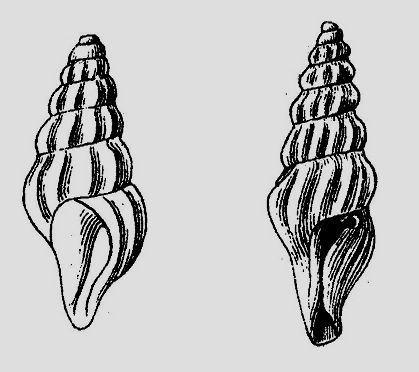
- Original image of a shell of Syntomodrillia lissotropis

Scientific classification
- Kingdom: Animalia
- Phylum: Mollusca
- Class: Gastropoda
- Subclass: Caenogastropoda
- Order: Neogastropoda
- Superfamily: Conoidea
- Family: Drilliidae
- Genus: Syntomodrillia
- Species: S. lissotropis

Binomial name
- Syntomodrillia lissotropis (Dall, 1881)

Synonyms
- Pleurotoma (Mangilia) lissotropis Dall, 1881 (original combination); Pleurotoma lissotropis Dall, 1881; Splendrillia lissotropis (Dall, 1881)

= Syntomodrillia lissotropis =

Species of gastropod

Syntomodrillia lissotropis is a species of sea snail, a marine gastropod mollusk in the family Drilliidae.

== Description ==
The length of the shell attains 4.5 mm, its diameter 1.75 mm.

Original description, under the name P. (Mangilia) lissotropis, otherwise Mangilia lissotropis:

"The small, slender shell is somewhat bluntly tipped. It contains six whorls, shining with the lustre of paraffine. The protoconch is rather large, bullate, smooth, translucent, shining. The remaining whorls show transverse, stout, shouldered ribs (on the body whorl eleven) becoming obsolete anteriorly, and succeeded by a few (four or five) revolving riblets at the anterior extreme of the siphonal canal. The suture is appressed. The lines of growth are not evident. The whorls are rather inflated in appearance. The sinus notch is very slight. The aperture is small and unusually short. The columella is very short, straight, and pointed."

== Distribution ==
This marine species occurs in the Caribbean Sea and off Southern Brazil.
