= Syntomodrillia portoricana =

Scientific classification
- Kingdom: Animalia
- Phylum: Mollusca
- Class: Gastropoda
- Subclass: Caenogastropoda
- Order: Neogastropoda
- Superfamily: Conoidea
- Family: Drilliidae
- Genus: Syntomodrillia
- Species: S. portoricana

Binomial name
- Syntomodrillia portoricana Fallon, 2016

Synonyms
- Splendrillia tantula (Bartsch, 1934); Syntomodrillia tantula Bartsch, 1934 (invalid: secondary junior homonym of Syntomodrillia tantula (Conrad, 1848); Syntomodrillia portoricana is a replacement name)

Species of gastropod

Syntomodrillia portoricana is a species of sea snail, a marine gastropod mollusk in the family Drilliidae.

== Distribution ==
Fossils of this species have found in the United States state of Mississippi.
