= Syntomodrillia bermudensis =

Scientific classification
- Kingdom: Animalia
- Phylum: Mollusca
- Class: Gastropoda
- Subclass: Caenogastropoda
- Order: Neogastropoda
- Superfamily: Conoidea
- Family: Drilliidae
- Genus: Syntomodrillia
- Species: S. bermudensis

Binomial name
- Syntomodrillia bermudensis Fallon, 2016

Species of gastropod

Syntomodrillia bermudensis is a species of sea snail, a marine gastropod mollusc in the family Drilliidae. This species is endemic to the waters surrounding Bermuda, where it plays a role in the local marine biodiversity.

== Description ==
The length of the shell varies between 7 mm and 17 mm. The aperture of S. bermudensis is elongated and narrow, leading to a siphonal canal at the base, which is a common feature among members of its family. The overall morphology of this species reflects adaptations suited to its marine environment. Its delicate and intricate shell structure makes S. bermudensis an interesting subject for study within marine biology and malacology.

== Distribution ==
Syntomodrillia bermudensis is primarily found in the marine waters surrounding Bermuda. This species thrives in specific habitats that provide the necessary environmental conditions for its survival and reproduction. The distribution of S. bermudensis is closely linked to the availability of suitable substrates for feeding and shelter, often associated with sandy or rocky seafloors.
