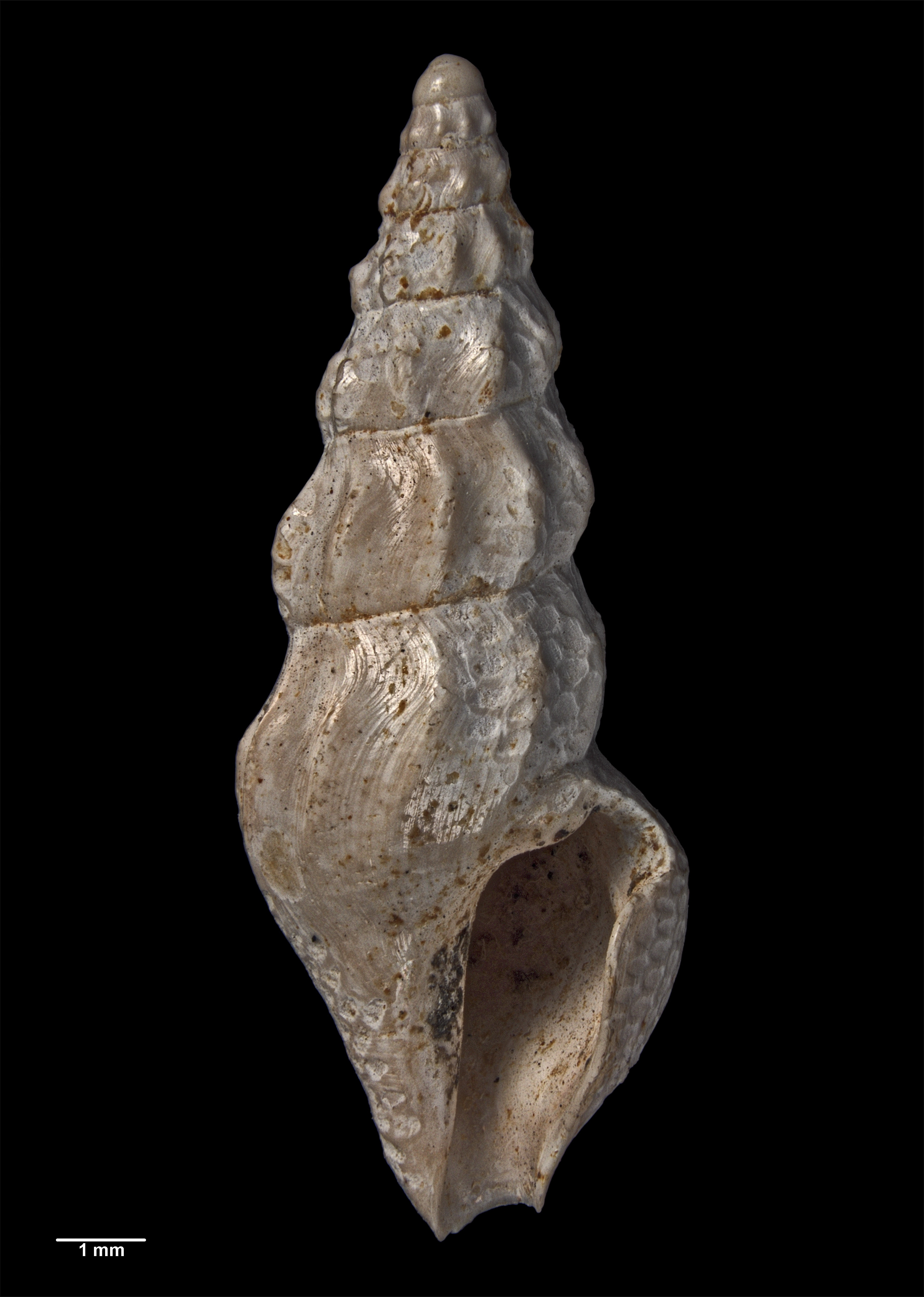
- Hauturua exuta

Scientific classification
- Kingdom: Animalia
- Phylum: Mollusca
- Class: Gastropoda
- Subclass: Caenogastropoda
- Order: Neogastropoda
- Superfamily: Conoidea
- Family: Drilliidae
- Genus: Hauturua; Powell, 1942

Type species
- Syntomodrillia vivens Powell, 1942

Species
- See text

= Hauturua =

Extinct genus of gastropods

Hauturua is a genus of sea snails, marine gastropod mollusks in the family Drilliidae.

== Distribution ==
Fossils of the species are found in Miocene strata of Australia and New Zealand, and recent extant species in New Zealand.

== Species ==
Species within the genus Hauturua include:

- † Hauturua bijuga (Marwick, 1931)
- † Hauturua exiguescens (Marwick, 1931)
- † Hauturua exuta (A. W. B. Powell, 1944)
- † Hauturua laevella (Marwick, 1931)
- Hauturua vellai (Beu, 1970)
- Hauturua vivens (A. W. B. Powell, 1942)
