= Syntomodrillia socolatea =

Scientific classification
- Kingdom: Animalia
- Phylum: Mollusca
- Class: Gastropoda
- Subclass: Caenogastropoda
- Order: Neogastropoda
- Superfamily: Conoidea
- Family: Drilliidae
- Genus: Syntomodrillia
- Species: S. socolatea

Binomial name
- Syntomodrillia socolatea Fallon, 2016

Species of gastropod

Syntomodrillia socolatea is a species of sea snail, a marine gastropod mollusk in the family Drilliidae.

== Description ==
The length of the shell attains 6.3 mm.

== Distribution ==
This marine species occurs in the Caribbean Sea off Quintana Roo, Yucátan Peninsula, Mexico.
