= Syntomodrillia trinidadensis =

Scientific classification
- Kingdom: Animalia
- Phylum: Mollusca
- Class: Gastropoda
- Subclass: Caenogastropoda
- Order: Neogastropoda
- Superfamily: Conoidea
- Family: Drilliidae
- Genus: Syntomodrillia
- Species: S. trinidadensis

Binomial name
- Syntomodrillia trinidadensis Fallon, 2016

Species of gastropod

Syntomodrillia trinidadensis is a species of sea snail, a marine gastropod mollusc in the family Drilliidae.

== Description ==
The length of the shell attains 11.3 mm (0.44 in).

== Distribution ==
This marine species occurs off Trinidad.
