= Syntomodrillia mellea =

Scientific classification
- Kingdom: Animalia
- Phylum: Mollusca
- Class: Gastropoda
- Subclass: Caenogastropoda
- Order: Neogastropoda
- Superfamily: Conoidea
- Family: Drilliidae
- Genus: Syntomodrillia
- Species: S. mellea

Binomial name
- Syntomodrillia mellea Fallon, 2016

Species of gastropod

Syntomodrillia mellea is a species of sea snail, a marine gastropod mollusc in the family Drilliidae.

== Description & Distribution ==
The length of the shell varies between 5 mm and 6.4 mm. This marine species occurs in the Caribbean Sea off Mexico.
