= Syntomodrillia lyra =

Scientific classification
- Kingdom: Animalia
- Phylum: Mollusca
- Class: Gastropoda
- Subclass: Caenogastropoda
- Order: Neogastropoda
- Superfamily: Conoidea
- Family: Drilliidae
- Genus: Syntomodrillia
- Species: S. lyra

Binomial name
- Syntomodrillia lyra Fallon, 2016

Species of gastropod

Syntomodrillia lyra is a species of sea snails, a marine gastropod mollusc in the family Drilliidae.

== Description ==
The length of the shell attains 8 mm.

== Distribution ==
This marine species occurs in the Caribbean Sea off Quintana Roo, Yucátan Peninsula, Mexico
