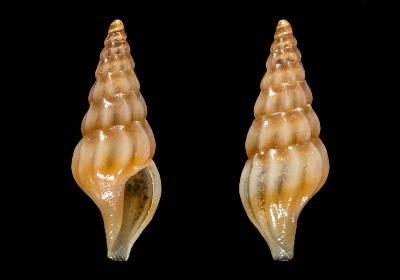
- Shell of Syntomodrillia stahlschmidti (paratype in the MNHN, Paris)

Scientific classification
- Kingdom: Animalia
- Phylum: Mollusca
- Class: Gastropoda
- Subclass: Caenogastropoda
- Order: Neogastropoda
- Superfamily: Conoidea
- Family: Drilliidae
- Genus: Syntomodrillia
- Species: S. stahlschmidti

Binomial name
- Syntomodrillia stahlschmidti Fallon, 2016

= Syntomodrillia stahlschmidti =

Species of gastropod

Syntomodrillia stahlschmidti is a species of sea snail, a marine gastropod mollusk in the family Drilliidae.

== Description ==
The length of the shell varies between 7 mm and 9 mm.

== Distribution ==
This marine species occurs in the Caribbean Sea off Colombia.
