= Syntomodrillia vitrea =

Scientific classification
- Kingdom: Animalia
- Phylum: Mollusca
- Class: Gastropoda
- Subclass: Caenogastropoda
- Order: Neogastropoda
- Superfamily: Conoidea
- Family: Drilliidae
- Genus: Syntomodrillia
- Species: S. vitrea

Binomial name
- Syntomodrillia vitrea McLean & Poorman, 1971

Species of gastropod

Syntomodrillia vitrea is a species of sea snail, a marine gastropod mollusk in the family Drilliidae.

== Description ==
The length of the shell varies between 6 mm and 12 mm.

== Distribution ==
This species occurs in the Pacific Ocean off Costa Rica and Panama.
