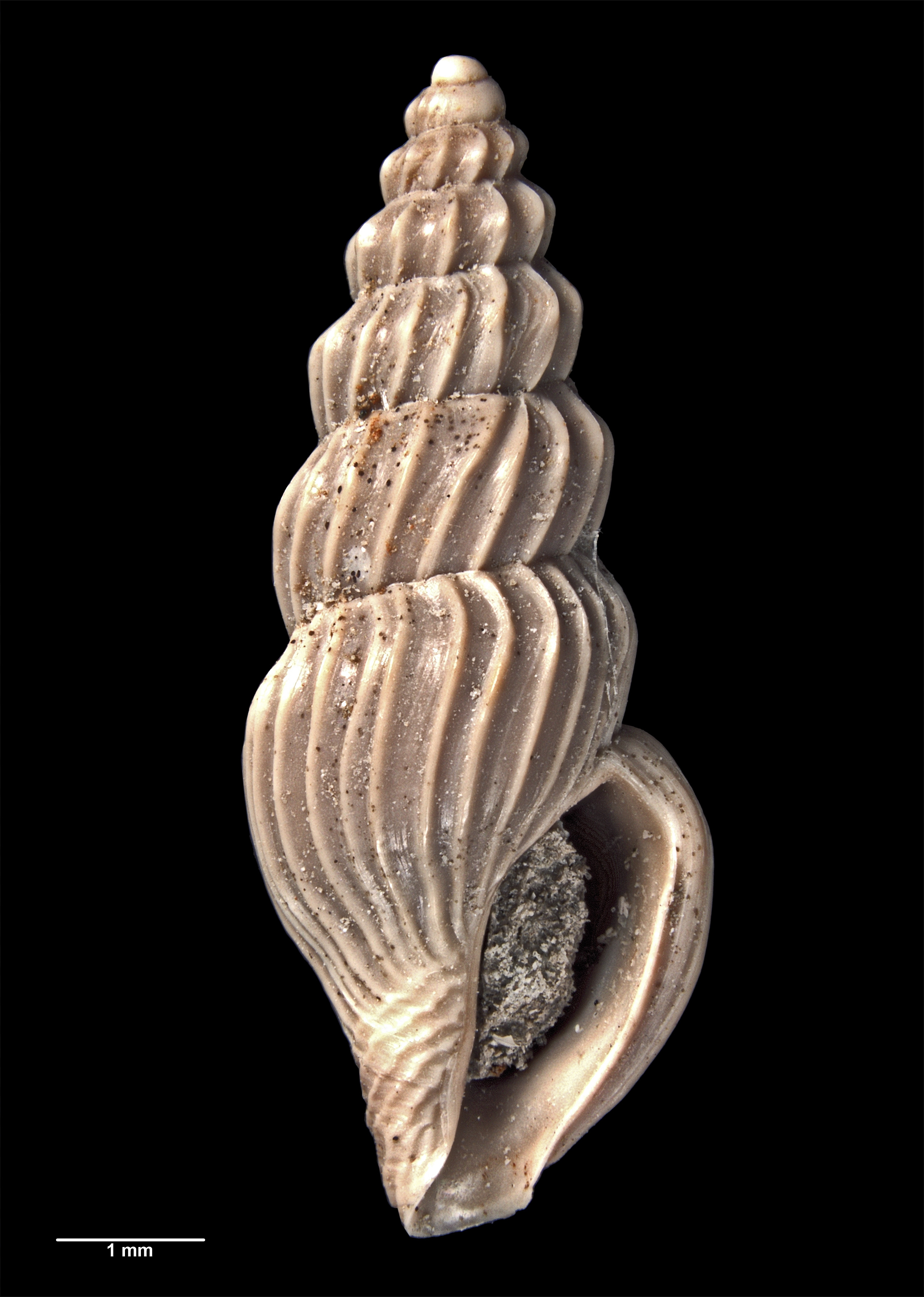
- Holotype from Auckland War Memorial Museum

Scientific classification
- Kingdom: Animalia
- Phylum: Mollusca
- Class: Gastropoda
- Subclass: Caenogastropoda
- Order: Neogastropoda
- Family: Drilliidae
- Genus: Syntomodrillia
- Species: †S. venusta

Binomial name
- †Syntomodrillia venusta Powell, 1944

Synonyms
- † Syntomodrillia complexa A. W. B. Powell, 1944; † Syntomodrillia compta A. W. B. Powell, 1944

= Syntomodrillia venusta =

Syntomodrillia venusta Temporal range: middle Miocene

Extinct species of gastropod

Syntomodrillia venusta is an extinct species of sea snail, a marine gastropod mollusc in the family Drilliidae. Fossils of the species date to the middle Miocene, and have been found in the strata of the Port Phillip Basin of Victoria, Australia.

== Description ==
In the original description, Powell described the species as follows:

Shell glossy, whorls bluntly angled above middle. Sculpture consisting of distinct, narrow, rounded, flexuous axials, 21-24 per whorl, extending from upper suture over base to the neck, which bears six distinct spiral threads. Outer lip terminated by a heavy hollow varix. This labial varix restricts the depth of the posterior sinus, which is abnormally shallow for the genus.

The holotype of the species measures 7.9 mm (0.31 in) in height and 3 mm (0.12 in) in diameter.

== Taxonomy ==
The species was first described by A.W.B. Powell in 1944. The holotype was collected from Fossil Beach, Balcombe Bay, Victoria, Australia, at an unknown date prior to 1944, and is held by the Auckland War Memorial Museum. In 2024, Thomas A. Darragh synonymised S. complexa and S. compta with S. venusta, as junior subjective synonyms.

== Distribution ==
This extinct marine species dates to the middle Miocene, and occurs in the strata of the Port Phillip Basin of Victoria, Australia, found in the Gellibrand Formation, and the Altona Bay brown coal shafts.

== Gallery ==
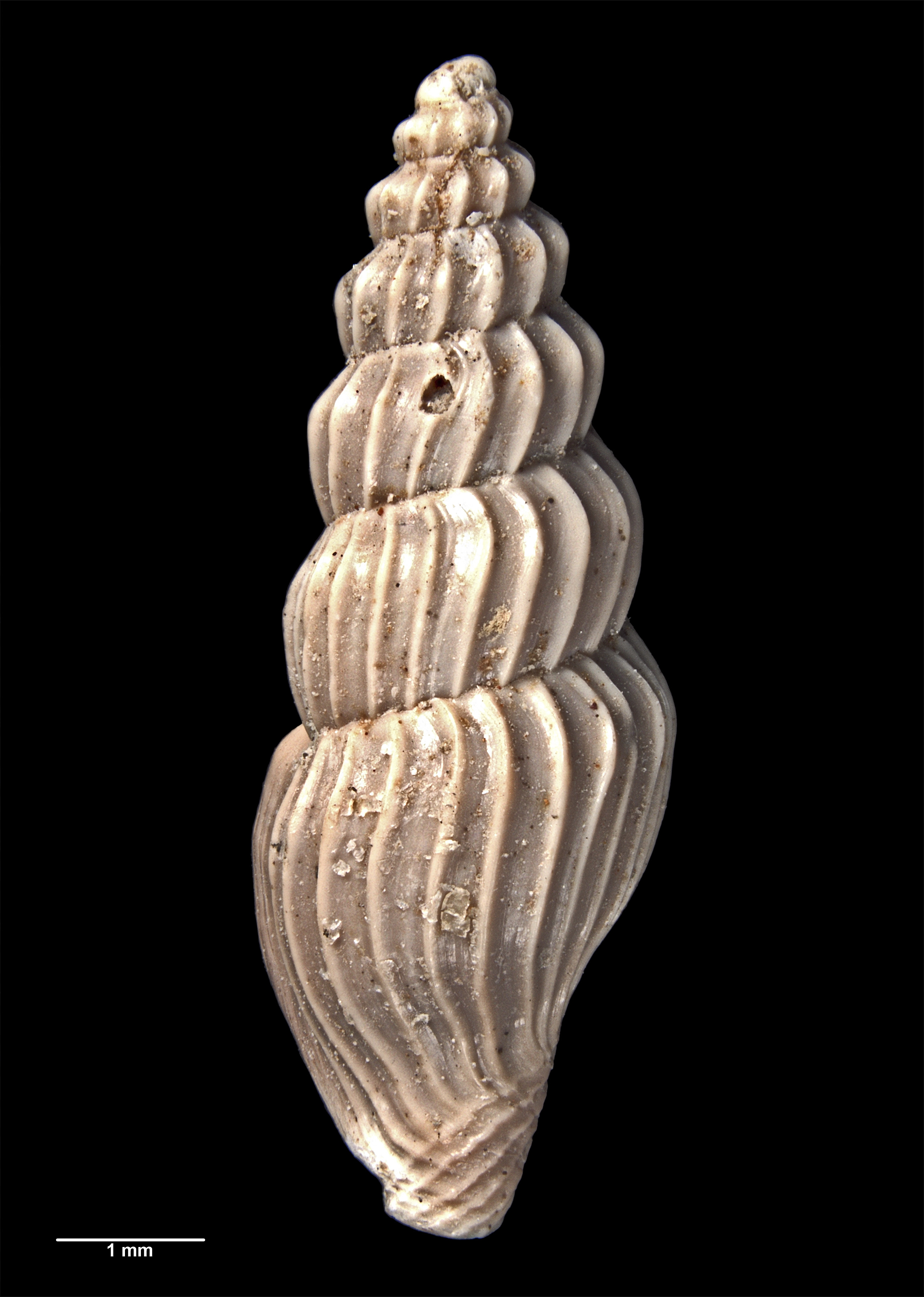
Reverse view of holotype

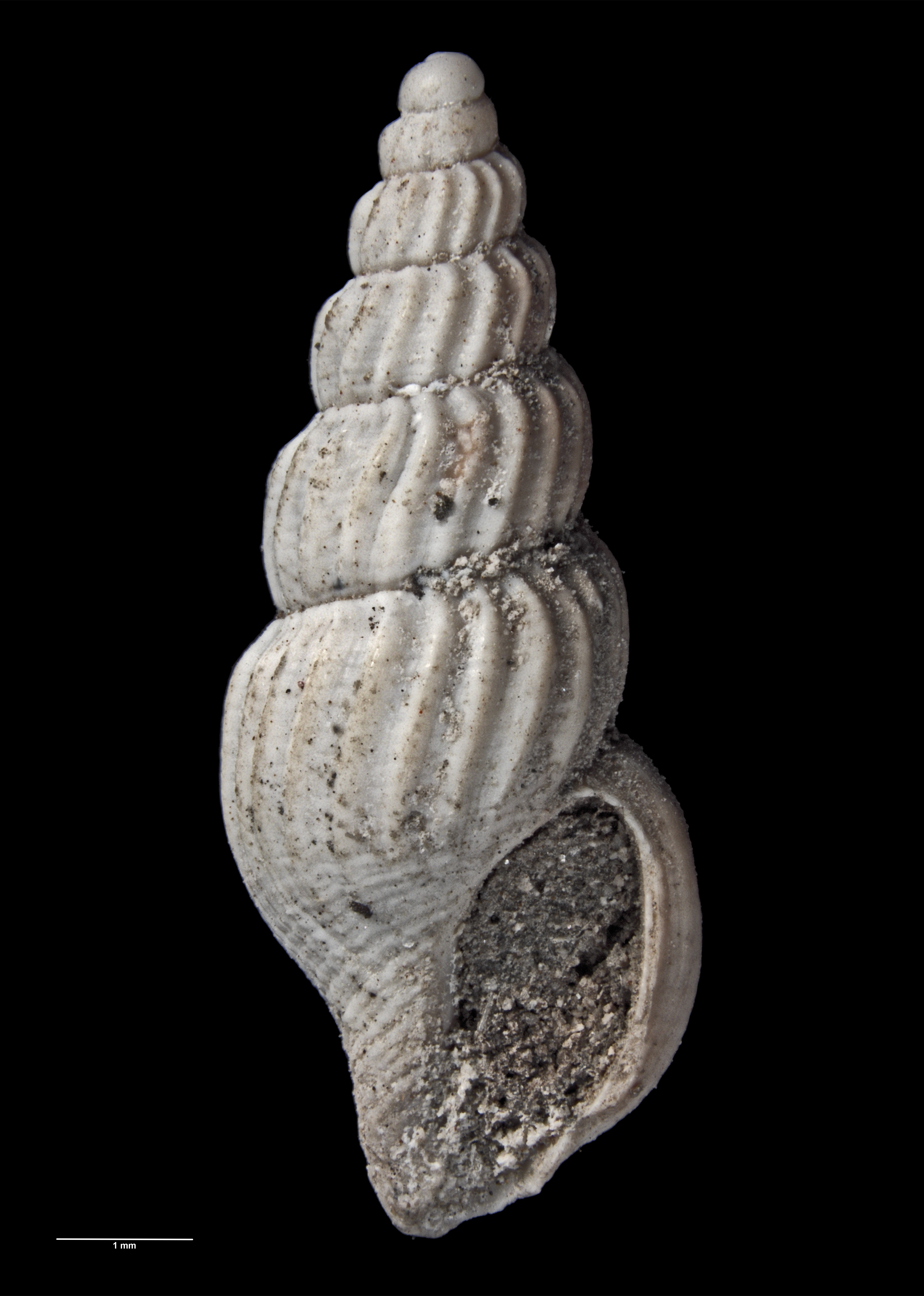
Type specimen (holotype of S. complexa)

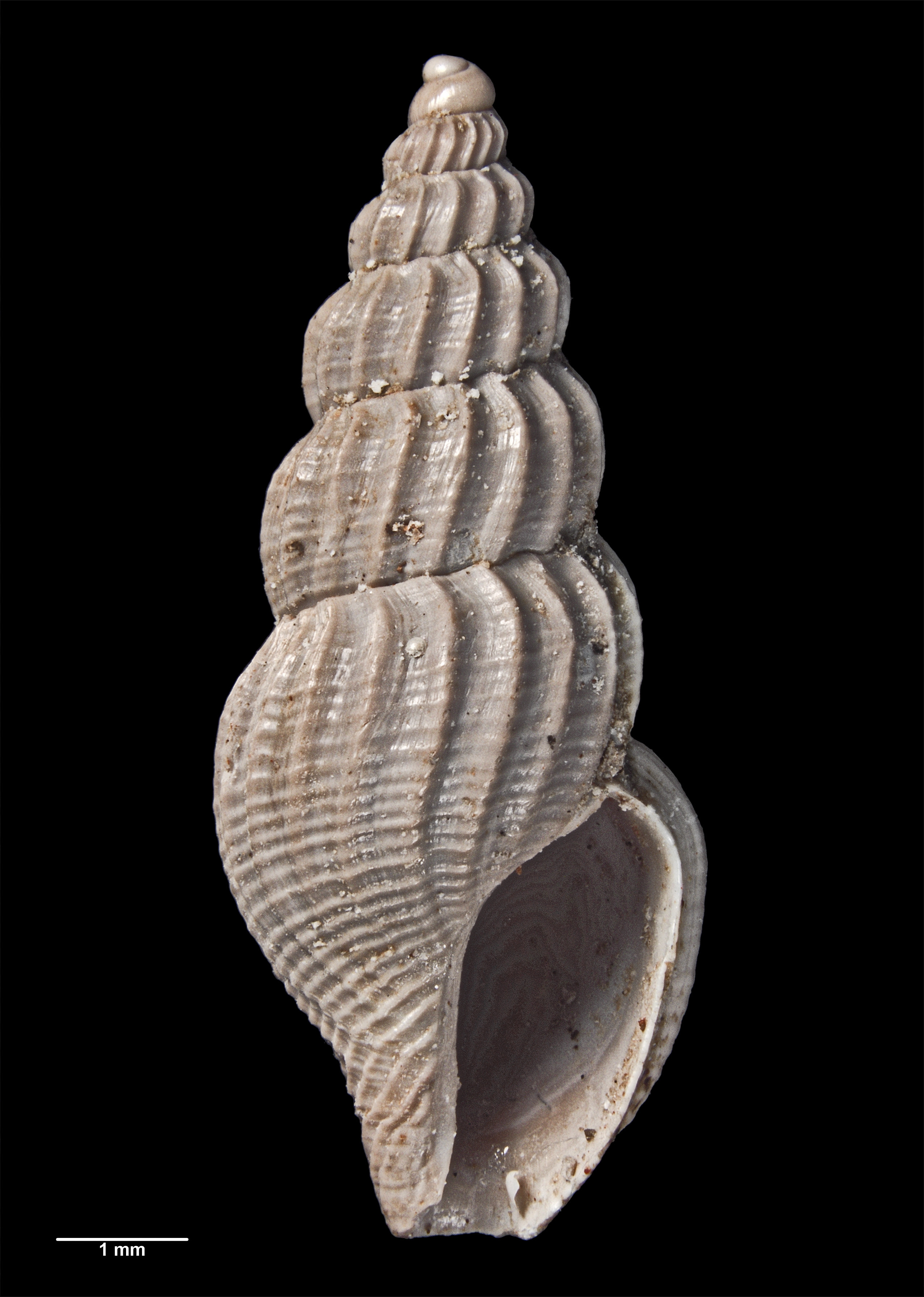
Type specimen (holotype of S. compta)
