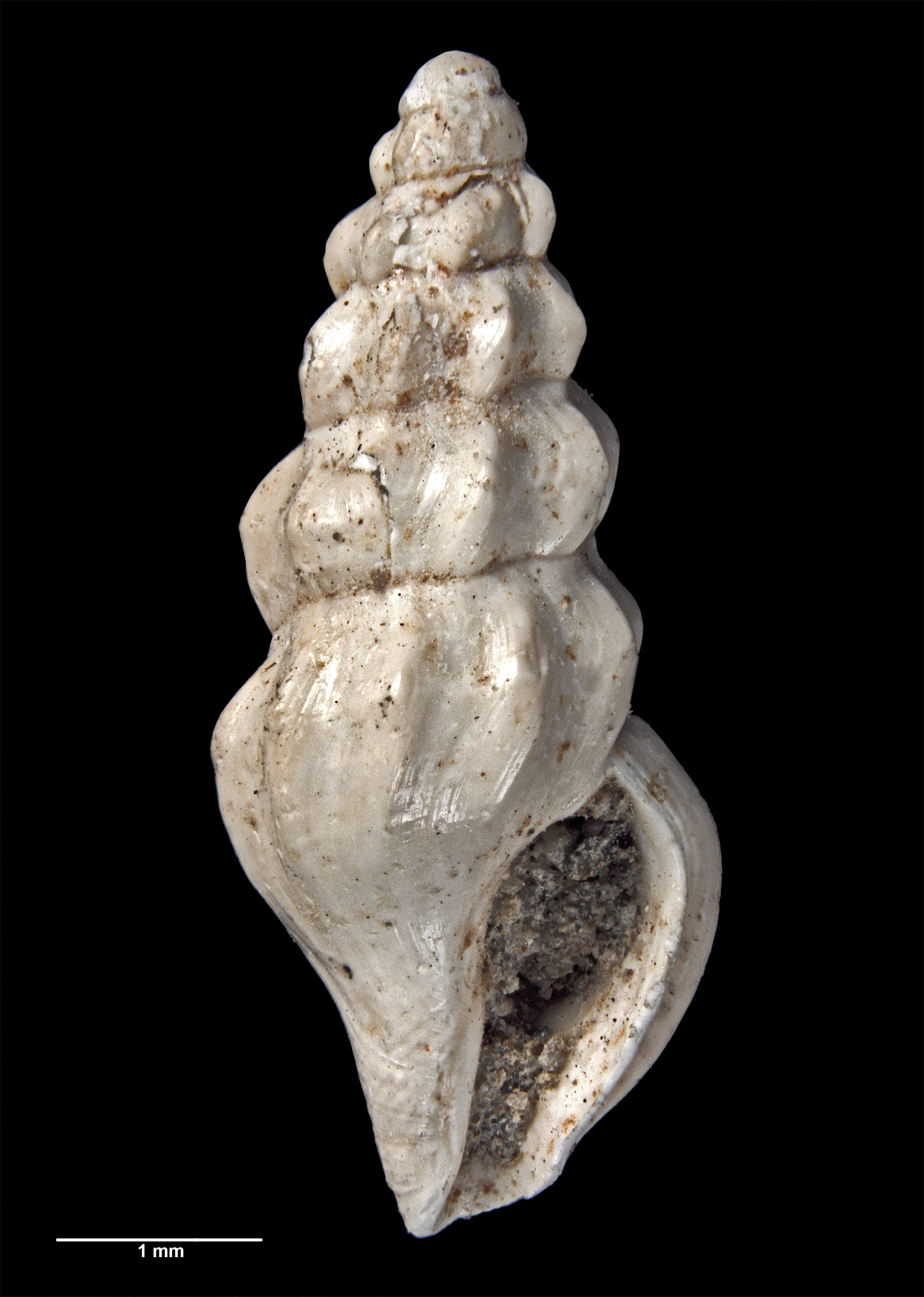
- Holotype from Auckland War Memorial Museum

Scientific classification
- Kingdom: Animalia
- Phylum: Mollusca
- Class: Gastropoda
- Subclass: Caenogastropoda
- Order: Neogastropoda
- Family: Drilliidae
- Genus: Syntomodrillia
- Species: †S. waiauensis

Binomial name
- †Syntomodrillia waiauensis Powell, 1942

= Syntomodrillia waiauensis =

Syntomodrillia waiauensis Temporal range: middle Miocene

Extinct species of gastropod

Syntomodrillia waiauensis is an extinct species of sea snail, a marine gastropod mollusc in the family Drilliidae. Fossils of the species date to the middle Miocene, and have been found at Clifden, Southland, New Zealand.

== Description ==
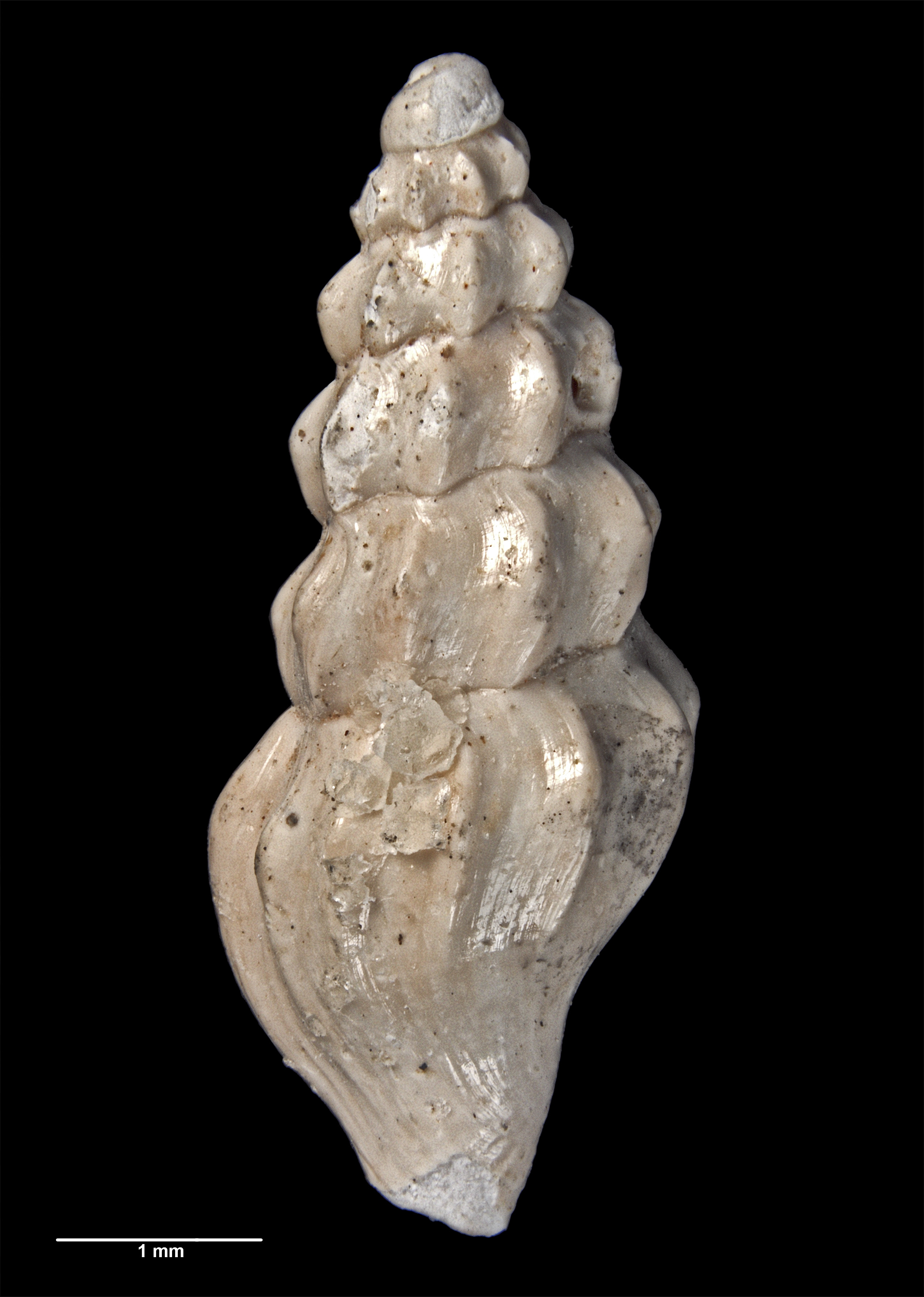
Reverse view of holotype

The species has a small fusiform shell, and a spire that is marginally taller than the aperture and canal combined. The shell has 6.5 whorls, including a protoconch of two whorls which are globular and smooth. The holotype of the species measures 5.5 mm (0.22 in) in height and 2.3 mm (0.091 in) in diameter.

== Taxonomy ==
The species was first described by A.W.B. Powell in 1942. The holotype was collected from the Slip Point Siltstone near Clifden, Southland, New Zealand at an unknown date prior to 1942. It is held by the Auckland War Memorial Museum.

== Distribution ==
This extinct marine species dates to the middle Miocene (Clifdenian), and occurs in the strata of the Slip Point Siltstone in Clifden, Southland, New Zealand.
