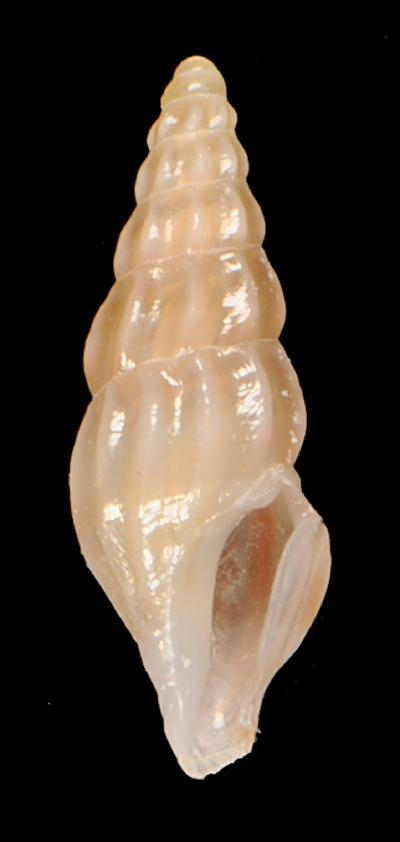
- Shell of Syntomodrillia cookei (specimen at MNHN, Paris)

Scientific classification
- Kingdom: Animalia
- Phylum: Mollusca
- Class: Gastropoda
- Subclass: Caenogastropoda
- Order: Neogastropoda
- Superfamily: Conoidea
- Family: Drilliidae
- Genus: Syntomodrillia
- Species: S. cookei

Binomial name
- Syntomodrillia cookei (E. A. Smith, 1888)

Synonyms
- Leptadrillia cookei (E. A. Smith, 1888); Pleurotoma (Drillia) cookei Smith E. A., 1888; Pleurotoma cookei E. A. Smith, 1888

= Syntomodrillia cookei =

Species of gastropod

Syntomodrillia cookei is a species of sea snail, a marine gastropod mollusk in the family Drilliidae.

== Description ==
The fusiform shell grows to a length of 8.5 mm.

== Distribution ==
This species occurs in the benthic zone of the Caribbean Sea (Jamaica, Colombia, Costa Rica, Mexico, Puerto Rico), the Gulf of Mexico (Florida to Texas), Guadeloupe, and the western Atlantic Ocean (northern Brazil).
