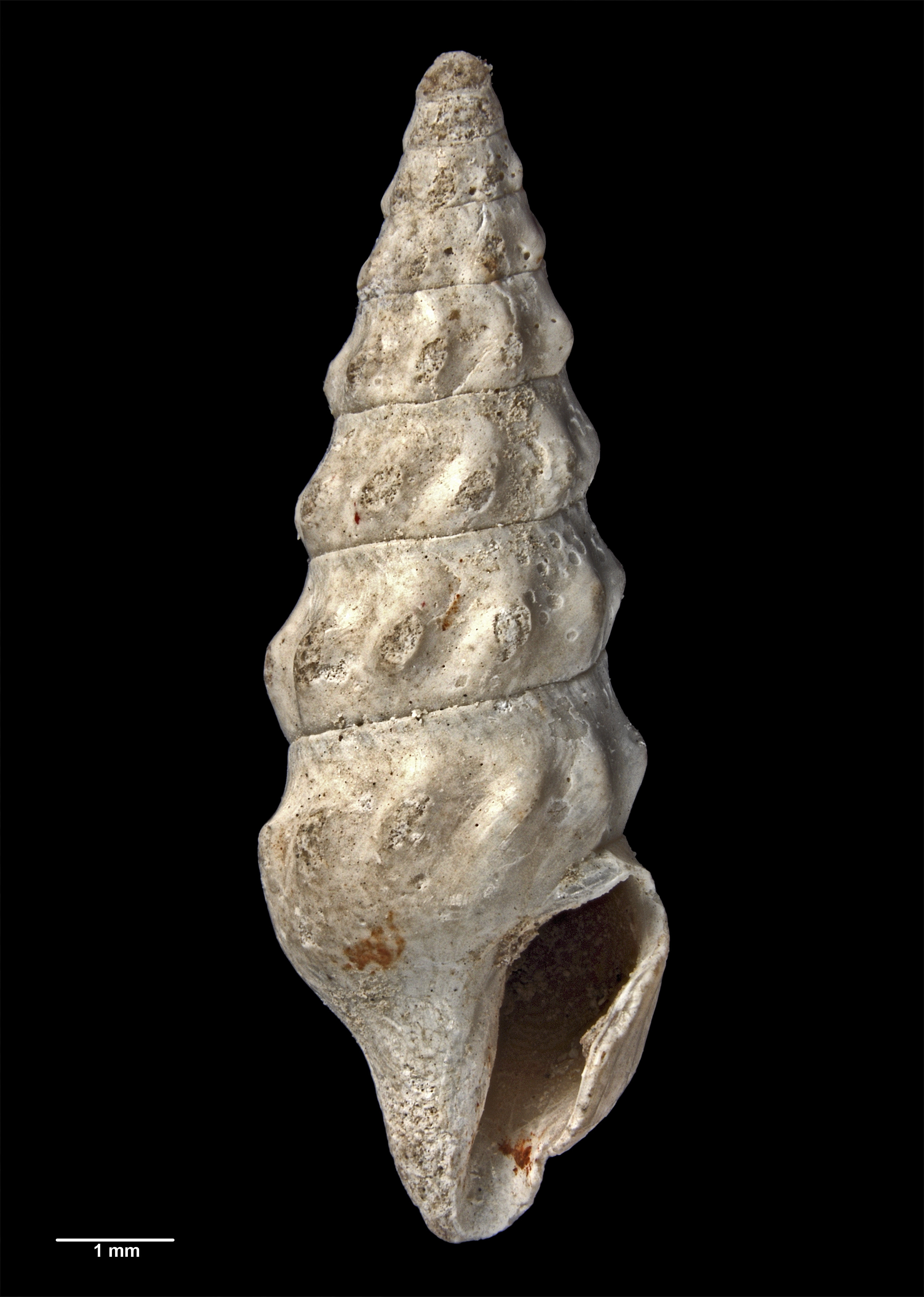
- Holotype from Auckland War Memorial Museum

Scientific classification
- Kingdom: Animalia
- Phylum: Mollusca
- Class: Gastropoda
- Subclass: Caenogastropoda
- Order: Neogastropoda
- Family: Drilliidae
- Genus: Hauturua
- Species: H. vivens

Binomial name
- Hauturua vivens (A. W. B. Powell, 1942)

Synonyms
- Splendrillia vivens A. W. B. Powell, 1942; Splendrillia (Hauturua) vivens A. W. B. Powell, 1942; Syntomodrillia (Hauturua) vivens (A. W. B. Powell, 1942); Syntomodrillia vivens (A. W. B. Powell, 1942)

= Hauturua vivens =

Species of gastropod

Hauturua vivens is a species of sea snail, a marine gastropod mollusc in the family Drilliidae. This species is endemic to New Zealand, typically found off the northeastern coast of the North Island.

== Description ==
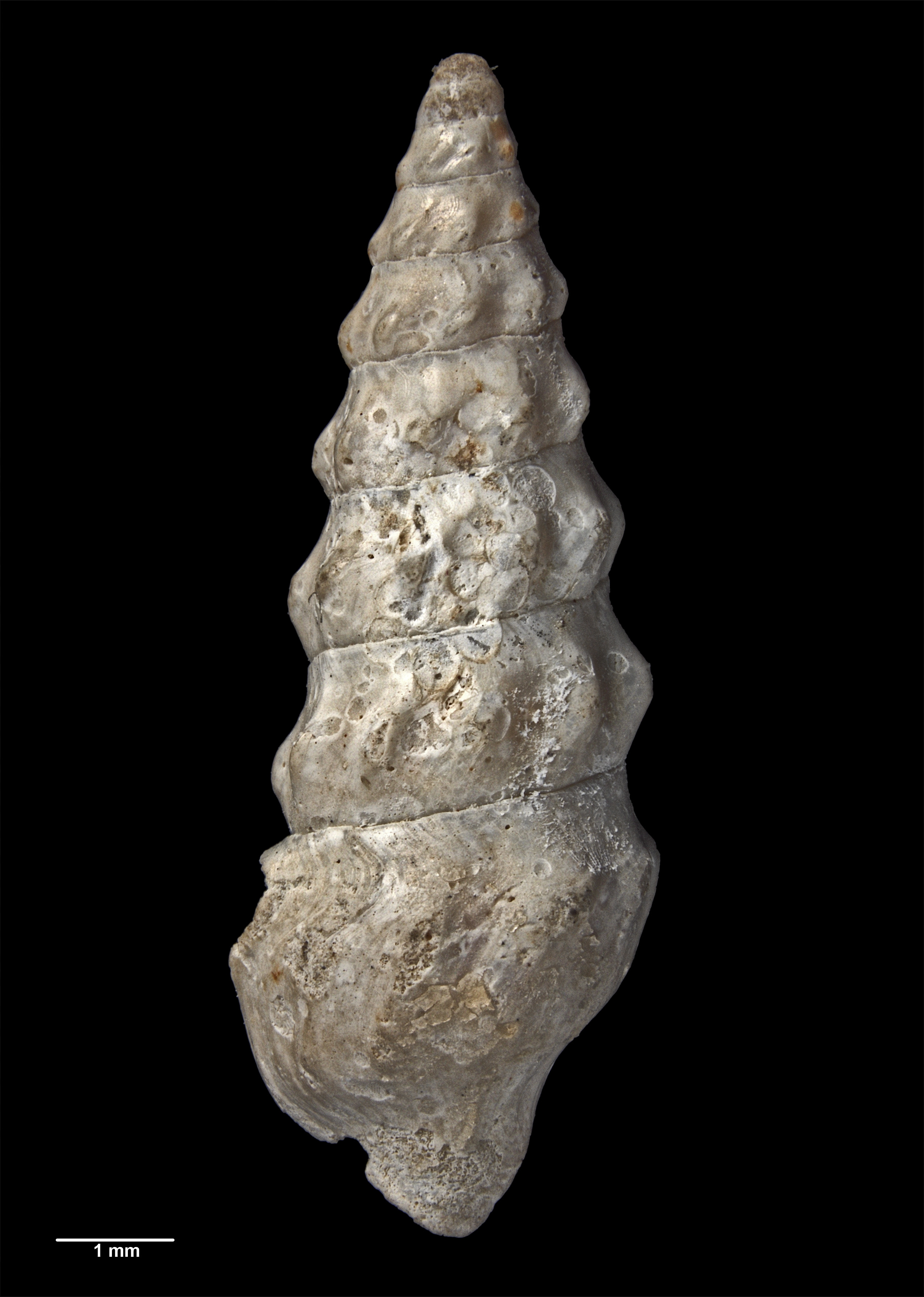
Reverse view of holotype

H. vivens has a moderately-sized shell and a tall spire which is more than twice the height of the aperture and the canal, and a narrow body whorl with a slight basal angulation that suddenly constricts. It has eight whorls, and a smooth globular protoconch of two whorls. The post-nuclear whorls are angled just below the middle. There are ten axials on the penultimate, and the shell surface is smooth, except for some spiral threads on the neck. The axials are reduced to a peripheral row of approximately ten pointed tubercules per whorl. The shell is white in colour and shines. The species measures 10 mm (0.39 in) in height and 3.3 mm (0.13 in) in diameter.

The species looks visually similar to Splendrillia debilis, but can be distinguished due to the lack of the subsutural spiral fold, by having a taller spire, and due to its angulate and excavated base.

== Taxonomy ==
The species was first described by A.W.B. Powell in 1942, using the name Splendrillia (Hauturua) vivens. By 1949, the species had begun to be referred to as Syntomodrillia (Hauturua) vivens. By at least 2011, Hauturua was being treated as a genus, making the species' accepted name Hauturua vivens. The holotype was collected from a depth of 37 m (121 ft) off the coast of Little Barrier Island in the Auckland Region, New Zealand at an unknown date prior to 1942, and is held by the Auckland War Memorial Museum.

== Distribution ==
H. vivens is endemic to New Zealand, with shells found typically found north-east of the North Island from depths ranging between 37–146 m (121–479 ft), with other reports of shells being found on the Chatham Rise and off the coast of eastern Otago.
