= Syntomodrillia iphis =

Scientific classification
- Kingdom: Animalia
- Phylum: Mollusca
- Class: Gastropoda
- Subclass: Caenogastropoda
- Order: Neogastropoda
- Superfamily: Conoidea
- Family: Drilliidae
- Genus: Syntomodrillia
- Species: S. iphis

Binomial name
- Syntomodrillia iphis Woodring, 1928

Extinct species of gastropod

Syntomodrillia iphis is an extinct species of sea snail, a marine gastropod mollusk in the family Drilliidae.

== Description ==
The length of the shell attains 6.3 mm, its diameter 2 mm.

== Distribution ==
This extinct species was found in Pliocene strata of Jamaica; age range: 3.6 to 2.588 Ma.
