= Syntomodrillia curacaoensis =

Scientific classification
- Kingdom: Animalia
- Phylum: Mollusca
- Class: Gastropoda
- Subclass: Caenogastropoda
- Order: Neogastropoda
- Superfamily: Conoidea
- Family: Drilliidae
- Genus: Syntomodrillia
- Species: S. curacaoensis

Binomial name
- Syntomodrillia curacaoensis Fallon, 2016

Species of gastropod

Syntomodrillia curacaoensis is a species of sea snail, a marine gastropod mollusc in the family Drilliidae.

== Description ==
The length of the shell varies between 6.8 mm and 7.9 mm.

== Distribution ==
This marine species occurs off Curaçao
