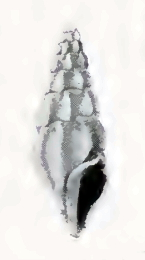
- Original image of a shell of † Syntomodrillia inadrina

Scientific classification
- Kingdom: Animalia
- Phylum: Mollusca
- Class: Gastropoda
- Subclass: Caenogastropoda
- Order: Neogastropoda
- Superfamily: Conoidea
- Family: Drilliidae
- Genus: Syntomodrillia
- Species: S. inadrina

Binomial name
- Syntomodrillia inadrina (Mansfield 1925)

Synonyms
- † Drillia inadrina Mansfield, 1925

= Syntomodrillia inadrina =

Species of gastropod

Syntomodrillia inadrina is an extinct species of sea snail, a marine gastropod mollusk in the family Drilliidae.

Originally described by the American paleontologist Wendell C. Mansfield in 1925 as Drillia inadrina (Mansfield, 1925)., this species is an important marker for studying the marine life of the Miocene epoch in the Caribbean. It was moved to the genus Syntomodrillia (established by Woodring in 1928) because it fits the criteria for smaller, more delicate Caribbean "drills" compared to the larger, more robust Drillia species.

As of 2026 it is still in the database WoRMS described as † Drillia inadrina Mansfield, 1925

== Description ==
The length of the shell attains 6.6 mm, its diameter 2.2 mm.

The holotype measures approximately 6.6 mm in length and 2.2 mm in diameter.

The fusiform shell is slender and has a tall, steeply rising spire. The sculpture shows strong, rounded and slightly curved axial ribs (vertical ridges). These ribs are typically intersected by very fine, almost microscopic spiral threads.

Like most Drilliids, it has a distinct "U-shaped" notch (anal sinus) on the upper part of the outer lip. This allows the snail to extend its respiratory siphonal canal even when retracted.

== Distribution ==
This extinct species occurred in the warm, shallow seas in the Middle Miocene strata for 15.97 to 11.608 Ma years ago in the Brasso Formation of Trinidad and Tobago.

This-fossil species is an important marker for studying the marine life of the Miocene epoch in the Caribbean. Based on the sediment where it is found, it likely lived in a neritic environment (shallow coastal waters) on sandy or muddy bottoms
