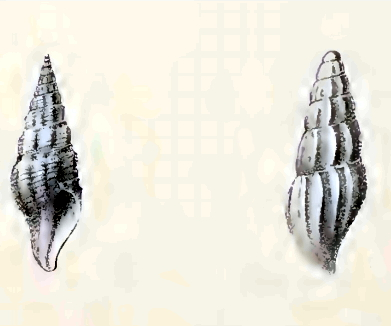
- Original image of a shell of Syntomodrillia hypsela

Scientific classification
- Kingdom: Animalia
- Phylum: Mollusca
- Class: Gastropoda
- Subclass: Caenogastropoda
- Order: Neogastropoda
- Superfamily: Conoidea
- Family: Drilliidae
- Genus: Syntomodrillia
- Species: S. hypsela

Binomial name
- Syntomodrillia hypsela (R. B. Watson, 1881)

Synonyms
- Pleurotoma (Mangelia) hypsela Watson, 1881; Pleurotoma hypsela Watson, 1881; Splendrillia hypsela (Watson, 1881)

= Syntomodrillia hypsela =

Species of gastropod

Syntomodrillia hypsela is a species of sea snail, a marine gastropod mollusk in the family Drilliidae.

== Description ==
The length of the shell attains 4.8 mm.

(Original description) The high, narrow shell has a conical shape. It contains 6 very short whorls. The body whorl is exceptionally small, with a short conical base and very small snout. The suture is very slight, but extremely oblique. The apex is blunt and rounded. There are narrow, high, rounded, curved, and very oblique ribs, which run continuously from the apex to the point of the base, but not to the snout. There are obsolete spiral striae, which become stronger on the point of the columella. The original specimen of this very marked species is in too bad condition for more minute description.

== Distribution ==
This marine species occurs off Pernambuco, Brasil.
