= Syntomodrillia triangulos =

Scientific classification
- Kingdom: Animalia
- Phylum: Mollusca
- Class: Gastropoda
- Subclass: Caenogastropoda
- Order: Neogastropoda
- Superfamily: Conoidea
- Family: Drilliidae
- Genus: Syntomodrillia
- Species: S. triangulos

Binomial name
- Syntomodrillia triangulos Fallon, 2016

Species of sea snail

Syntomodrillia triangulos is a species of sea snail, a marine gastropod mollusk in the family Drilliidae.

== Description ==
The length of the shell varies between 6 mm and 8 mm, and can range from several holotype or paratype varieties.

== Distribution ==
This marine species occurs in the Caribbean Sea off the coast of Mexico.
