= Splendrillia debilis =

Scientific classification
- Kingdom: Animalia
- Phylum: Mollusca
- Class: Gastropoda
- Subclass: Caenogastropoda
- Order: Neogastropoda
- Superfamily: Conoidea
- Family: Drilliidae
- Genus: Splendrillia
- Species: S. debilis

Binomial name
- Splendrillia debilis Finlay H. J., 1927

Synonyms
- Drillia laevis parva H.H. Suter, 1908; Splendrillia laevis parva (H.H. Suter, 1908)

Species of gastropod

Splendrillia debilis is a species of sea snail, a marine gastropod mollusk in the family Drilliidae.

== Description ==
The height of the shell attains 8 mm, its diameter 3.5 mm.

The species is distinguished from Splendrillia aoteana by its much smaller size, the broader shoulder, and the slender, short, oblique costae, sometimes reduced to pointed tubercles on the body whorl, their number being 12 to 14 on the body whorl.

The proboscis is of moderate size compared to the rhynchodeum (a tubular chamber anterior to the proboscis).

== Distribution ==
This marine species occurs off Ninety Mile Beach, North Island, New Zealand.
