= Splendrillia aoteana =

- Original image of Splendrillia aoteana

Scientific classification
- Kingdom: Animalia
- Phylum: Mollusca
- Class: Gastropoda
- Subclass: Caenogastropoda
- Order: Neogastropoda
- Superfamily: Conoidea
- Family: Drilliidae
- Genus: Splendrillia
- Species: S. aoteana

Binomial name
- Splendrillia aoteana Finlay H. J., 1930

Synonyms
- Drillia laevis (Hutton, 1873); Pleurotoma laevis Hutton, 1873 (original description); Splendrillia laevis (F.W. Hutton, 1873)

Species of gastropod

Splendrillia aoteana is a species of sea snail, a marine gastropod mollusk in the family Drilliidae.

This species has also been found a fossil in Pliocene Strata of New Zealand.

This name was in 1930 introduced by Finlay as a nomen novum pro Pleurotoma laevis Hutton, 1873a, non Pleurotoma laevis Bellardi, 1847.

== Description ==
The length of the shell attains 18 mm, its diameter 7 mm.

(Original description) The solid shell has a claviform shape. It is axially costate, with a pinkish spiral band. The sculpture consists of oblique rounded and strong axial ribs, beginning at the angle of the shoulder, and extending to the suture below. On the body whorl they are obsolete on the base. Their number is about 14 on a whorl. The whole surface, and especially the interstices, are very distinctly striated by fine flexuous growth lines, crescent-shaped on the smooth depression of the shoulder. The microscopic spiral lines are sometimes visible on the shoulder, and, a little stouter, upon the lower part of the base. The lightly elevated fasciole is very finely transversely striated. The colour of the shell is pale fulvous, usually with a broad spiral band of pink on the centre of the whorls. The spire is high, acuminate, turreted, nearly twice the height of the aperture. The protoconch consists of 1½ smooth convex white whorls, the nucleus broadly rounded. The teleoconch contains about 8 whorls, regularly increasing, a little concave at the narrow shoulder, andconvex below it. The body whorl is flatly rounded below the angle, but faintly contracted at the base. The sutureis distinct and not deep. The aperture is oblique, narrowly ovate, produced below into a short straight and widely open siphonal canal, sinuated at the base. The outer lip is convex, a little contracted below, thickened inside, with a rather deep and narrow sinus above, its margins thickly callous. The columella is subvertical, drawn out to a fine point below. The inner lip is smooth, broad, and thick, extending over the parietal wall, which has a prominent tubercle margining the sinus. The operculum is unknown.

== Distribution ==
This species occurs in the demersal zone of the Pacific Ocean off New Zealand.
