= Clavus falcicosta =

Scientific classification
- Kingdom: Animalia
- Phylum: Mollusca
- Class: Gastropoda
- Subclass: Caenogastropoda
- Order: Neogastropoda
- Superfamily: Conoidea
- Family: Drilliidae
- Genus: Clavus
- Species: C. falcicosta

Binomial name
- Clavus falcicosta (Barnard, 1958)

Synonyms
- Drillia falcicosta Barnard, 1958; Tylotiella falcicosta (Barnard, 1958)

Species of gastropod

Clavus falcicosta is a species of sea snail, a marine gastropod mollusk in the family Drilliidae.

== Description ==
The whorls are not shouldered. The axial ribs do not undulating on base and are not weakening below the suture. The spiral threads are microscopic or absent, except on the rostrum. The base of the body whorl lacks a row of pustules The terminal varix is strong. The subsutural region is not contrastingly dark.

== Distribution ==
This marine species occurs off KwaZulu-Natal & Zululand, South Africa.
