= Syntomodrillia woodringi =

Scientific classification
- Kingdom: Animalia
- Phylum: Mollusca
- Class: Gastropoda
- Subclass: Caenogastropoda
- Order: Neogastropoda
- Superfamily: Conoidea
- Family: Drilliidae
- Genus: Syntomodrillia
- Species: S. woodringi

Binomial name
- Syntomodrillia woodringi Bartsch, 1934

Synonyms
- Splendrillia woodringi (Bartsch, 1934)

Species of gastropod

Syntomodrillia woodringi is a species of sea snail, a marine gastropod mollusk in the family Drilliidae. The species is named in honor of Wendell P. Woodring.

== Description ==
The length of the shell varies between 7 mm and 18 mm.

== Distribution ==
This marine species occurs in the Gulf of Mexico, the Caribbean Sea, of the Antilles, and Northern Brazil.
