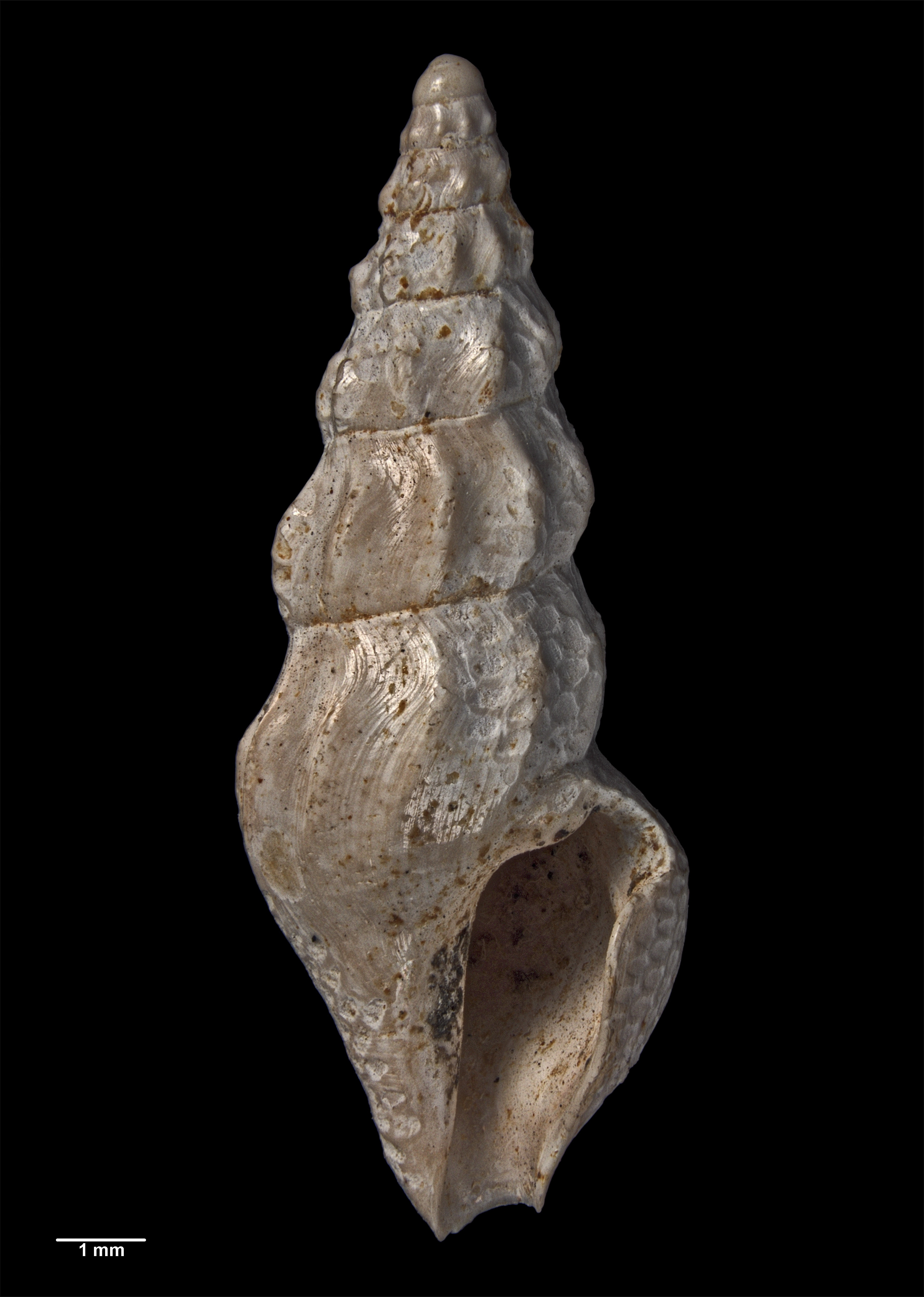
- Holotype from Auckland War Memorial Museum

Scientific classification
- Kingdom: Animalia
- Phylum: Mollusca
- Class: Gastropoda
- Subclass: Caenogastropoda
- Order: Neogastropoda
- Family: Drilliidae
- Genus: Hauturua
- Species: †H. exuta

Binomial name
- †Hauturua exuta (A. W. B. Powell, 1944)

Synonyms
- Syntomodrillia exuta A. W. B. Powell, 1944; Syntomodrillia (Hauturua) exuta A. W. B. Powell, 1944

= Hauturua exuta =

Hauturua exuta Temporal range: early Miocene

Extinct species of gastropod

Hauturua exuta is an extinct species of sea snail, a marine gastropod mollusc in the family Drilliidae. Fossils of the species date to the early Miocene, and occurs in the strata of the Gippsland Basin of Victoria, Australia.

== Description ==
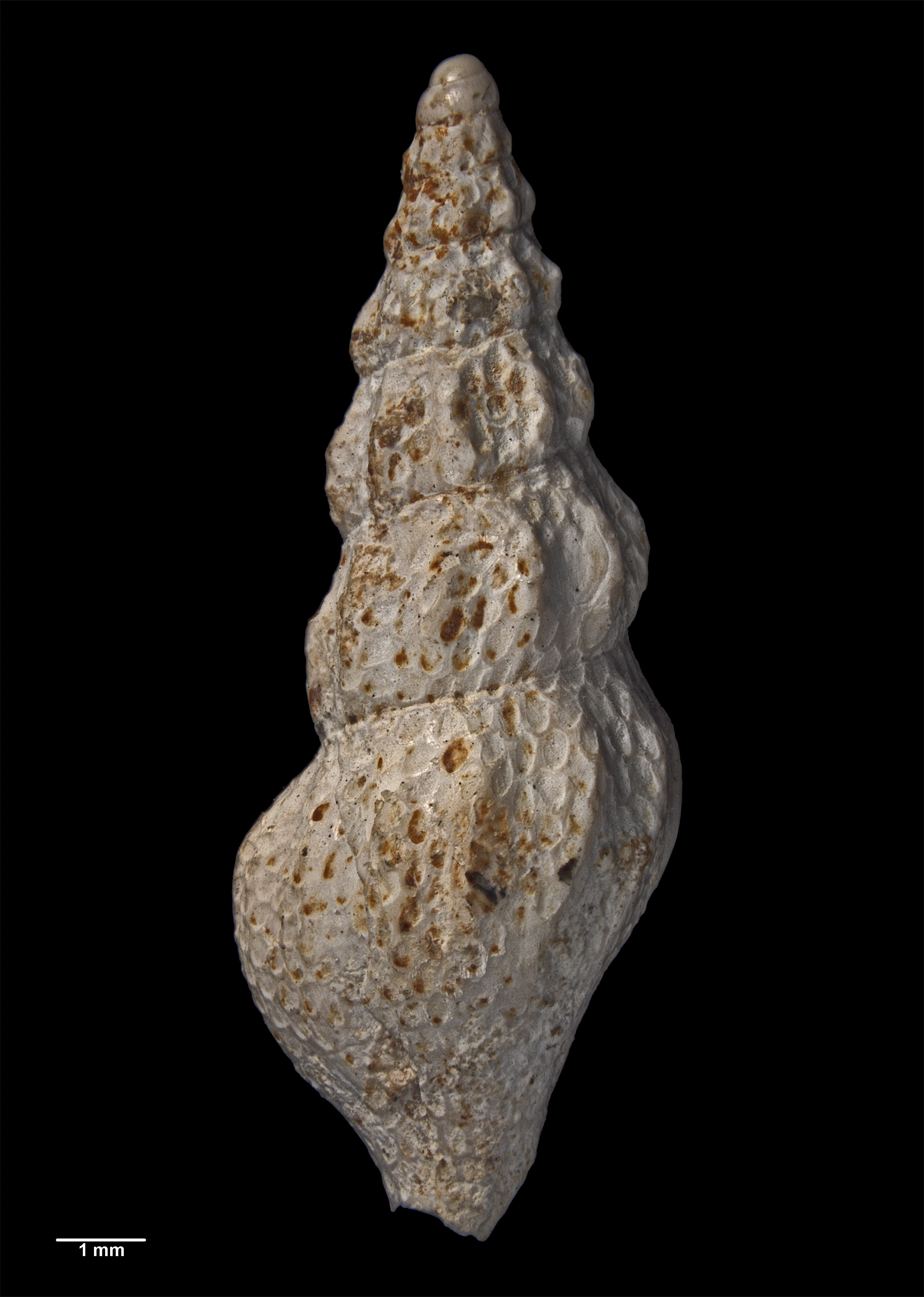
Reverse view of holotype

In the original description, Powell described the species as follows:

Shell moderately large, proportionately broad, strongly axially tuberculate, but entirely lacking spiral sculpture, even on the neck. Axtials broadly rounded, 13-14 per whorl, stopped at the angulate-periphery, which is situated at the middle of the whorls; becoming obsolete before reaching base. Subsutural fold obsolete. Shoulder broadly and shallowly excavated. Parietal callus-pad very heavy.

The holotype of the species measures 15.6 mm (0.61 in) in height and 6 mm (0.24 in) in diameter.

== Taxonomy ==
The species was first described by A.W.B. Powell in 1944, using the name Syntomodrillia (Hauturua) exuta. By at least 2011, Hauturua was being treated as a genus, making the species' accepted name Hauturua exuta. The holotype was collected from the Gippsland Lakes at an unknown date prior to 1944, and is held by the Auckland War Memorial Museum.

== Distribution ==
This extinct marine species dates to the early Miocene, and occurs in the strata of the Gippsland Basin of Victoria, Australia, from the Jemmys Point Formation.
