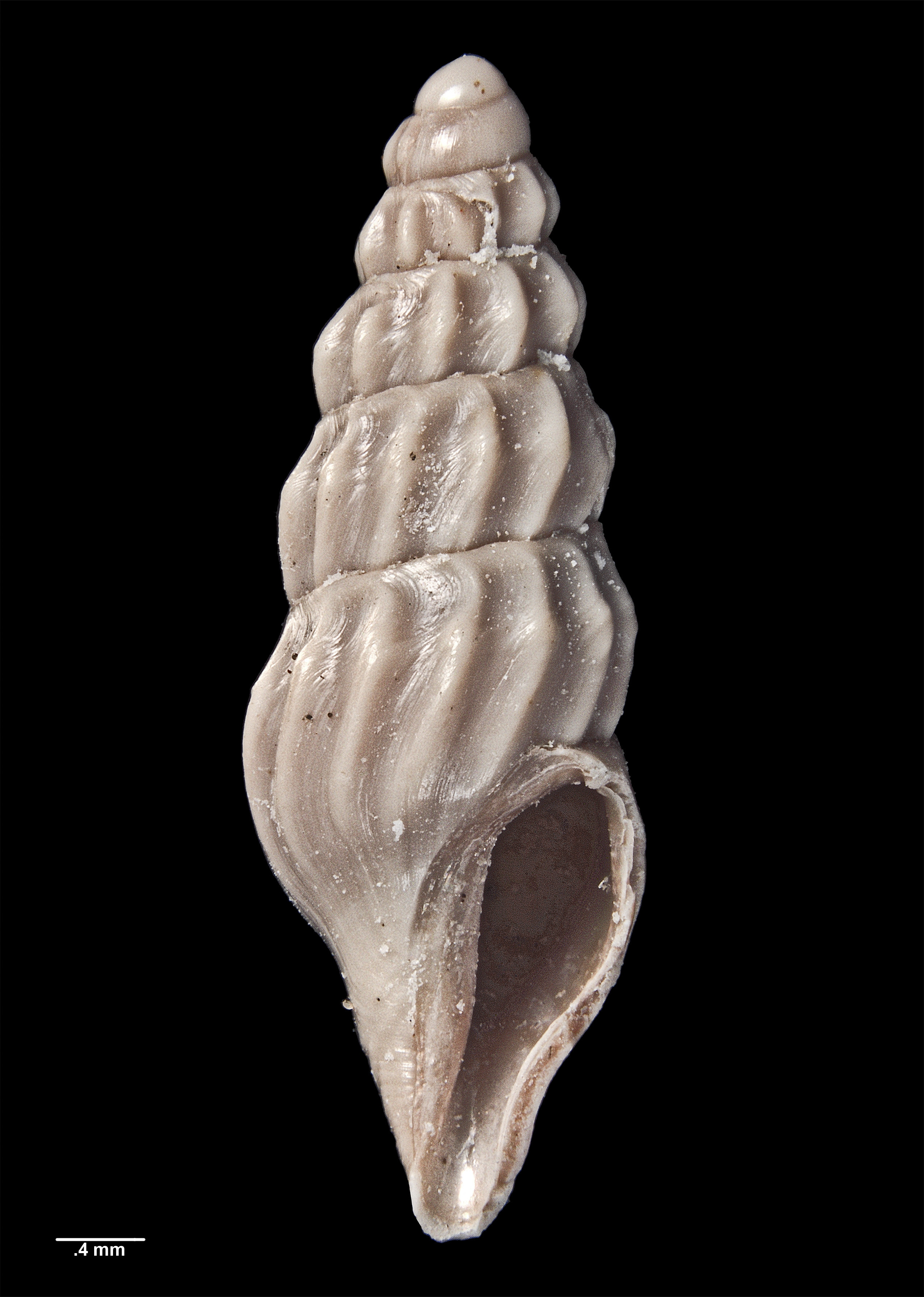
- Holotype from Auckland War Memorial Museum

Scientific classification
- Kingdom: Animalia
- Phylum: Mollusca
- Class: Gastropoda
- Subclass: Caenogastropoda
- Order: Neogastropoda
- Family: Drilliidae
- Genus: Syntomodrillia
- Species: †S. obsoleta

Binomial name
- †Syntomodrillia obsoleta Powell, 1944

= Syntomodrillia obsoleta =

Syntomodrillia obsoleta Temporal range: middle Miocene

Extinct species of gastropod

Syntomodrillia obsoleta is an extinct species of sea snail, a marine gastropod mollusc in the family Drilliidae. Fossils of the species date to the middle Miocene, and have been found in the strata of the Port Phillip Basin of Victoria, Australia.

== Description ==
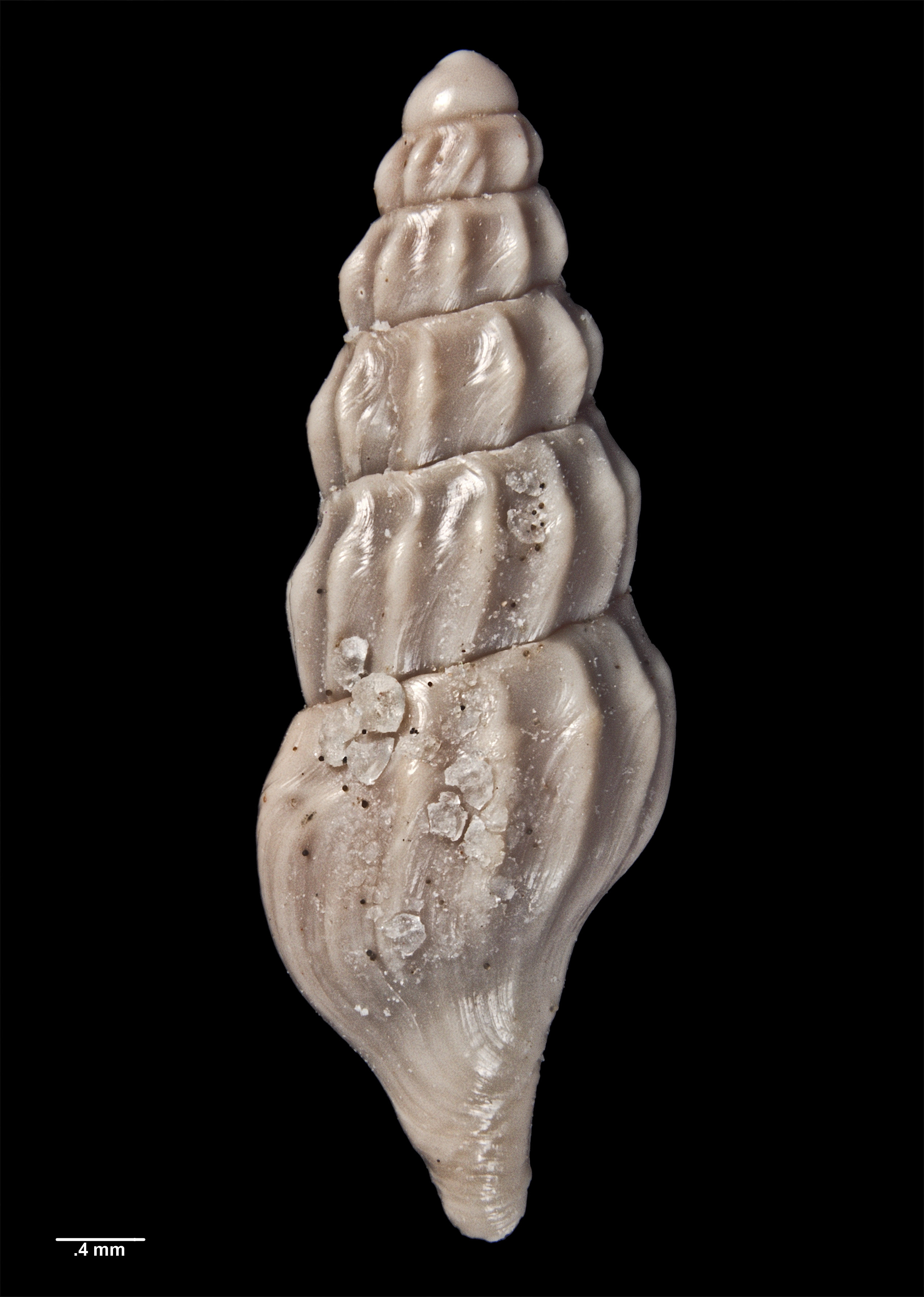
Reverse view of holotype

In the original description, Powell described the species as follows:

Much smaller than sandleroides, has weaker axials and obsolescent spirals. Shell small, glossy ; whorls 5½, including typical smooth, globular protoconch of two whorls. Post-nuclear whorls sculptured with moderately strong, but narrow, obliquely flexuous axials, which extend from the upper suture and fade out about the middle of the base; 12-13 per whorl; 12 on penultimate in holotype. The axials are slightly thickened at the weak peripheral angle, which is just above the middle. There is no spiral sculpture apart from four obsolescent threads on the anterior end.

The holotype of the species measures 5.3 mm (0.21 in) in height and 1.9 mm (0.075 in) in diameter.

== Taxonomy ==
The species was first described by A.W.B. Powell in 1944. The holotype was collected from Fossil Beach, Balcombe Bay, Victoria, Australia, at an unknown date prior to 1944, and is held by the Auckland War Memorial Museum.

== Distribution ==
This extinct marine species dates to the middle Miocene, and occurs in the strata of the Port Phillip Basin of Victoria, Australia, found in the Gellibrand Formation.
