= I. elegans =

I. elegans may refer to:

- Inquisitor elegans, a sea snail species
- Irus elegans, a bivalve mollusc species
- Ischnura elegans, a damselfly species
- Insara elegans, a katydid species
- Isodontia elegans, a wasp species
