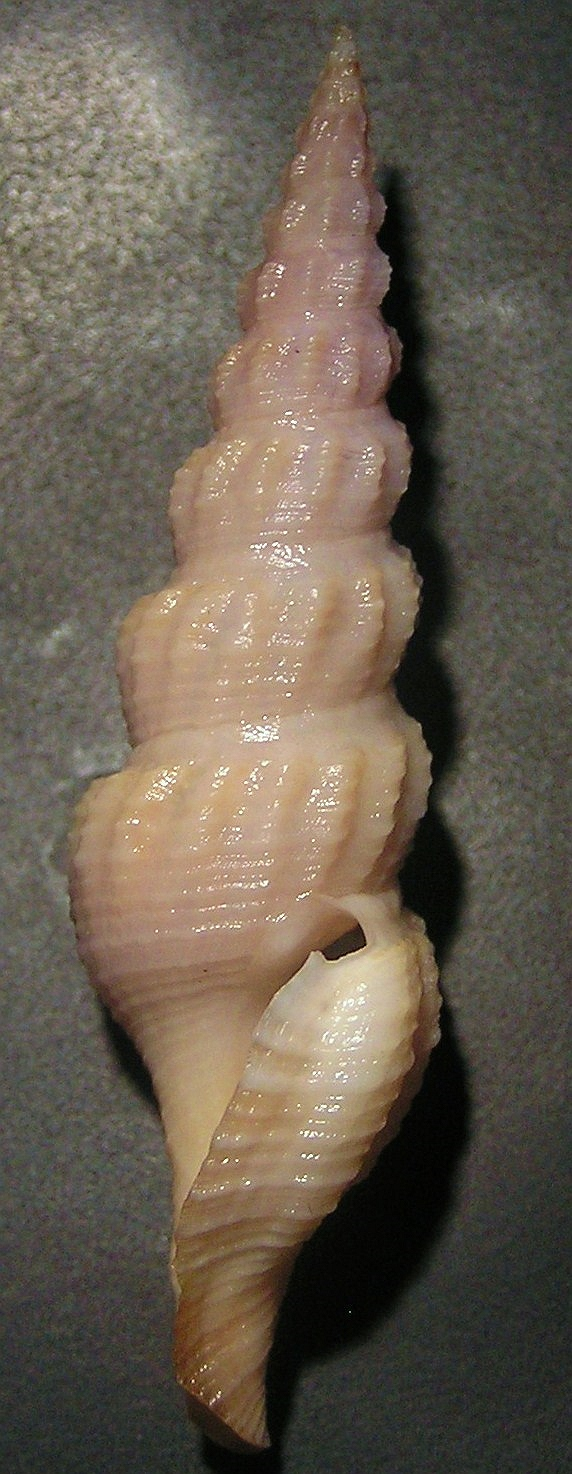
- A shell of Inquisitor aesopus

Scientific classification
- Kingdom: Animalia
- Phylum: Mollusca
- Class: Gastropoda
- Subclass: Caenogastropoda
- Order: Neogastropoda
- Superfamily: Conoidea
- Family: Pseudomelatomidae
- Genus: Inquisitor; Hedley, 1918

Type species
- Pleurotoma sterrha R. B. Watson, 1881

Species
- See text

= Inquisitor (gastropod) =

Genus of gastropods

Inquisitor is a genus of small predatory sea snails, marine gastropod mollusks in the family Pseudomelatomidae.

== Distribution ==
This marine genus occurs in the Indo-Pacific, from the Red Sea and East Africa to Japan; also off Australia.

== Species ==
According to the World Register of Marine Species (WoRMS), the following species with valid names are included within the genus Inquisitor:

- Inquisitor acervatus Cotton, 1947
- Inquisitor adenicus Sysoev, 1996
- Inquisitor aemula (Angas, 1877)
- Inquisitor aesopus (Schepman, 1913)
- Inquisitor alabaster (Reeve, 1843)
- Inquisitor angustiliratus Sysoev, 1996
- Inquisitor angustus Kuroda & Oyama, 1971
- Inquisitor arctatus Kilburn, 1988
- Inquisitor armillatus Stahlschmidt & Fraussen, 2014
- † Inquisitor awamoaensis (Hutton, 1873)
- † Inquisitor bataviana (K. Martin, 1895)
- Inquisitor carmen (G. B. Sowerby III, 1916)
- Inquisitor chocolatus (E. A. Smith, 1875)
- Inquisitor citreus Stahlschmidt & Fraussen, 2022
- † Inquisitor cosibensis (Yokoyama, 1920)
- Inquisitor dampieria (Hedley, 1922)
- † Inquisitor delicatulus (A. W. B. Powell, 1944)
- † Inquisitor detritus Ludbrook, 1941
- Inquisitor eburatus Bozzetti, 2011
- Inquisitor elachystoma (Martens, 1901)
- Inquisitor elegans Bozzetti, 1994
- Inquisitor elkeae Stahlschmidt, 2013
- Inquisitor exiguus (Kuroda & Oyama, 1971)
- † Inquisitor flemingi (Vella, 1954)
- Inquisitor flindersianus Hedley, 1922
- Inquisitor formidabilis Hedley, 1922
- † Inquisitor fraudator (Finlay & Marwick, 1937)
- Inquisitor frausseni Stahlschmidt, Poppe & Tagaro, 2018
- Inquisitor fusiformis Stahlschmidt, 2013
- † Inquisitor gippslandensis (A. W. B. Powell, 1944)
- Inquisitor glauce (Dall, 1918)
- Inquisitor harrymonti Stahlschmidt, Poppe & Tagaro, 2018
- † Inquisitor hebes Marwick, 1931
- Inquisitor hedleyi (Verco, 1909)
- Inquisitor hormophorus Sysoev & Bouchet, 2001
- Inquisitor imperceptus Stahlschmidt & Fraussen, 2022
- Inquisitor incertus (E. A. Smith, 1877)
- Inquisitor indistinctus Sysoev, 1996
- Inquisitor insignita (Melvill, 1923)
- Inquisitor interrupta (Lamarck, 1816)
- Inquisitor intertinctus (E. A. Smith, 1877)
- Inquisitor isabella Kilburn, 1988
- † Inquisitor ischnos (Philippi, 1887)
- Inquisitor janae Stahlschmidt & Fraussen, 2022
- Inquisitor japonicus (Lischke, 1869)
- Inquisitor kilburni Wells, 1994
- † Inquisitor komiticus Laws, 1939
- Inquisitor kurodai (Habe & Kosuge, 1966)
- Inquisitor lassulus Hedley, 1922
- Inquisitor latifasciata (G. B. Sowerby II, 1870)
- Inquisitor latiriformis Kilburn, 1988
- † Inquisitor lingulacaninus M. Griffin & S. N. Nielsen, 2008
- Inquisitor lorenzi Stahlschmidt, Poppe & Tagaro, 2018
- Inquisitor mactanensis Stahlschmidt, Poppe & Tagaro, 2018
- Inquisitor mastersi (Brazier, 1876)
- Inquisitor michaelmonti Stahlschmidt, Poppe & Tagaro, 2018
- Inquisitor midas Stahlschmidt & Fraussen, 2022
- Inquisitor millepunctatus Stahlschmidt, Poppe & Tagaro, 2018
- Inquisitor minutosternalis Kosuge, 1993
- Inquisitor mirabelflorenti Cossignani, 2016
- † Inquisitor mizunamiensis Itoigawa, 1960
- Inquisitor modulatus Stahlschmidt & Fraussen, 2022
- Inquisitor multilirata (E. A. Smith, 1877)
- Inquisitor nagasakiensis (E. A. Smith, 1879)
- † Inquisitor neglecta (K. Martin, 1895)
- Inquisitor nodicostatus Kilburn, 1988
- Inquisitor nudivaricosus Kuroda & Oyama, 1971
- † Inquisitor oblongulus (G. F. Harris, 1897)
- Inquisitor odhneri Wells, 1994
- Inquisitor plurinodulatus Cotton, 1947
- Inquisitor plurivaricis Li B.Q., Kilburn & Li X.Z., 2010
- † Inquisitor powelli (Dell, 1950)
- Inquisitor pseudoprincipalis (Yokoyama, 1920)
- Inquisitor radula (Hinds, 1843)
- Inquisitor ritae Stahlschmidt & Fraussen, 2017
- Inquisitor rubens Morassi, 1998
- Inquisitor rufovaricosus (Kuroda & Oyama, 1971)
- † Inquisitor scabriculus (A. W. B. Powell, 1944)
- Inquisitor sexradiata (Odhner, 1917)
- † Inquisitor shibanoi Masuda, 1967
- Inquisitor solomonensis (E. A. Smith, 1876)
- Inquisitor spicata (Hinds, 1843)
- Inquisitor stenos Sysoev, 1996
- Inquisitor sterrhus (R. B. Watson, 1881)
- Inquisitor subangusta (Schepman, 1913)
- Inquisitor taivaricosa Chang & Wu, 2000
- † Inquisitor trinervis (A. W. B. Powell, 1944)
- Inquisitor tuberosus (E. A. Smith, 1875)
- Inquisitor varicosus (Reeve, 1843)
- Inquisitor vesculus Stahlschmidt & Fraussen, 2022
- Inquisitor vividus Li B.Q., Kilburn & Li X.Z., 2010
- † Inquisitor vredenburgi H. J. Finlay, 1927
- Inquisitor vulpionis Kuroda & Oyama, 1971
- † Inquisitor waihoraensis Marwick, 1931
- † Inquisitor walleri Ladd, 1982
- Inquisitor zebra (Lamarck, 1822)
- Inquisitor zonata (Reeve, 1843)

Species brought into synonymy

- Inquisitor acutus Marwick, 1928 †: synonym of Mauidrillia acuta (Marwick, 1928) †
- Inquisitor alma Thiele, 1930: synonym of Inquisitor lassulus Hedley, 1922
- Inquisitor asper Marwick, 1926 †: synonym of Aoteadrillia asper (Marwick, 1926)†
- Inquisitor cerithina (Anton, 1838): synonym of Crassispira cerithina (Anton, 1838)
- Inquisitor coriorudis Hedley, 1922: synonym of Vexitomina coriorudis(Hedley, 1922) (original combination)
- Inquisitor cotteri (Vredenburg, 1921): synonym of Crassispira cotteri (Vredenburg, 1921)
- Inquisitor coxi Angas, 1867: synonym of Vexitomina coxi (Angas, 1867)
- † Inquisitor eoa Makiyama, 1927: synonym of Clathrodrillia eoa (Makiyama, 1927)
- † Inquisitor eonodatus Stilwell & Zinsmeister, 1992: synonym of Fusinus eonodatus (Stilwell & Zinsmeister, 1992)
- Inquisitor essingtonensis Smith, 1888: synonym of Inquisitor mastersi (Brazier, 1876)
- Inquisitor exigua Marwick, 1931 †: synonym of Aoteadrillia exigua (Marwick, 1931) † (original combination)
- Inquisitor fibratus Hedley, 1922: synonym of Inquisitor spicata (Hinds, 1843)
- Inquisitor flavidula [sic]: synonym of Inquisitor flavidulus (Lamarck, 1822): synonym of Clathrodrillia flavidula (Lamarck, 1822) (incorrect gender ending)
- Inquisitor flavidulus (Lamarck, 1822): synonym of Clathrodrillia flavidula (Lamarck, 1822)
- Inquisitor granobalteus Hedley, 1922: synonym of Turricula granobalteus (Hedley, 1922) (original combination)
- Inquisitor immaculatus Tenison-Woods, 1876: synonym of Paracuneus immaculatus (Tenison-Woods, 1876)
- † Inquisitor ihungia Marwick, 1931 : synonym of Aoteadrillia ihungia (Marwick, 1931) † (original combination)
- Inquisitor japonicum [sic]: synonym of Inquisitor japonicus (Lischke, 1869) (incorrect gender ending)
- Inquisitor jeffreysii (E. A. Smith, 1875): synonym of Funa jeffreysii (E. A. Smith, 1875)
- Inquisitor kawamurai (Habe & Kosuge, 1966) : synonym of Cheungbeia kawamurai (Habe & Kosuge, 1966)
- Inquisitor lacertosus Hedley, 1922: synonym of Bathytoma lacertosus (Hedley, 1922) (original combination)
- Inquisitor lanceolatus (Hupé, 1854): synonym of Ptychobela lanceolata (Hupé, 1854)
- Inquisitor laterculata (G. B. Sowerby II, 1870): synonym of Cheungbeia laterculata (G. B. Sowerby II, 1870)
- Inquisitor laterculoides (Barnard, 1958): synonym of Funa laterculoides (Barnard, 1958)
- Inquisitor mammillata (Kuroda and Oyama，1971): synonym of Mammillaedrillia mammillata (Kuroda and Oyama，1971)
- Inquisitor metcalfei Angas, 1867: synonym of Vexitomina metcalfei (Angas, 1867)
- Inquisitor minimarus Kosuge, 1993: synonym of Ptychobela minimarus (Kosuge, 1993)
- † Inquisitor molengraaffi (K. Martin, 1916): synonym of Crassispira molengraaffi (K. Martin, 1916)
- Inquisitor multicostellata Smith, 1888: synonym of Inquisitor latifasciata (Sowerby, 1870)
- Inquisitor nudivaricosa Kuroda, Habe & Oyama, 1971: synonym of Inquisitor nudivaricosus Kuroda, Habe & Oyama, 1971
- Inquisitor perclathrata Kuroda, 1960: synonym of Clavus (Clathrodrillia) perclathrata Azuma, 1960 (nomen nudum)
- Inquisitor petilinus Hedley, 1922: synonym of Conticosta petilinus (Hedley, 1922) (original combination)
- † Inquisitor problematicus Powell, 1942 : synonym of † Inquisitor awamoaensis (Hutton, 1873)
- Inquisitor sinensis (Hinds, 1843): synonym of Crassispira sinensis (Hinds, 1843)
- Inquisitor spadix (Watson, 1886): synonym of Paracuneus immaculatus (Tenison-Woods, 1876)
- Inquisitor spaldingi (Brazier, 1876): synonym of Inquisitor spicata (Hinds, 1843)
- Inquisitor spurius Hedley, 1922: synonym of Turricula nelliae spuria (Hedley, 1922) (original combination)
- Inquisitor suavis Smith, 1888: synonym of Vexitomina suavis (Smith, 1888)
- Inquisitor subochracea (E. A. Smith, 1877): synonym of Aguilaria subochracea (E. A. Smith, 1877)
- Inquisitor taylorianus (Reeve, 1846): synonym of Funa tayloriana (Reeve, 1846)
- † Inquisitor tokunagae H. J. Finlay, 1927: synonym of Guraleus tokunagae (H. J. Finlay, 1927)
- Inquisitor tuberosa (E.A. Smith, 1875): synonym of Brachytoma tuberosa (E. A. Smith, 1875)
- Inquisitor variabilis (E. A. Smith, 1877): synonym of Funa variabilis (E. A. Smith, 1877)
- Inquisitor ventricosa Smith, 1888 : synonym of Inquisitor glauce (Dall, 1918)
- Inquisitor versicolor Weinkauff & Kobelt, 1876: synonym of Inquisitor radula (Hinds, 1843)
- Inquisitor vexillium (Habe & Kosuge, 1966) : synonym of Ptychobela vexillium (Habe & Kosuge, 1966)
- † Inquisitor waihaoensis A. W. B. Powell, 1942 : synonym of Comitas waihaoensis (A. W. B. Powell, 1942)

== See also ==
- List of marine gastropod genera in the fossil record
