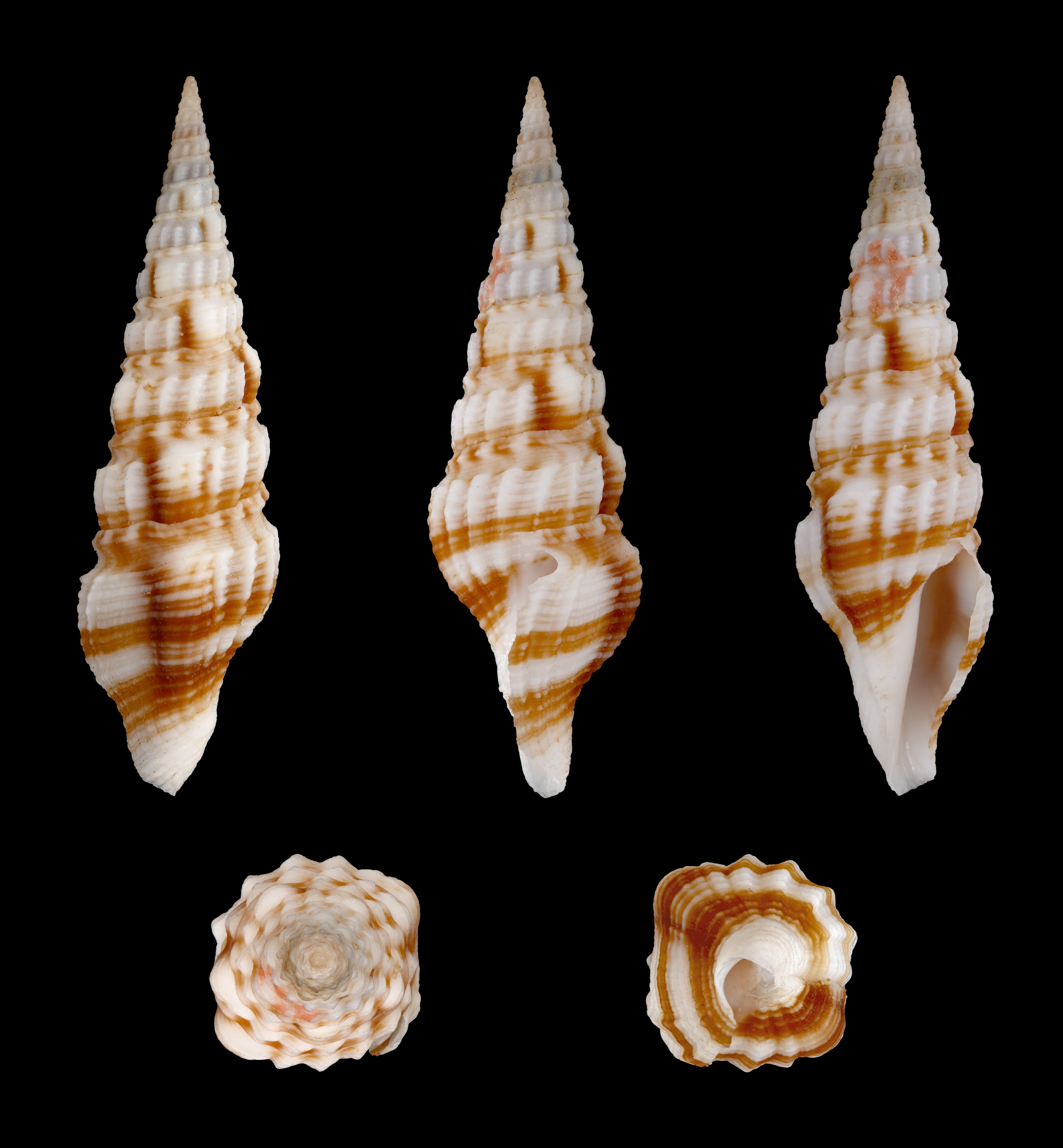
- Apertural view of a shell of Inquisitor varicosus

Scientific classification
- Kingdom: Animalia
- Phylum: Mollusca
- Class: Gastropoda
- Subclass: Caenogastropoda
- Order: Neogastropoda
- Superfamily: Conoidea
- Family: Pseudomelatomidae
- Genus: Inquisitor
- Species: I. varicosus

Binomial name
- Inquisitor varicosus (Reeve, 1843)

Synonyms
- Drillia varicosa (Reeve, 1843); Pleurotoma varicosa Reeve, 1843; Pleurotoma (Drillia) varicosa (Reeve, 1843); Turris (Inquisitor) varicosa (Reeve, 1843)

= Inquisitor varicosus =

Species of gastropod

Inquisitor varicosus is a species of sea snail, a marine gastropod mollusk in the family Pseudomelatomidae, the turrids and allies.

== Description ==
The length of the shell varies between 40 mm and 60 mm.

The whorls are smooth near the suture, longitudinally ribbed below, with large rude scattered varices. The sinus is broad and rather deep. The ribs are grayish on a darker surface, sometimes entirely brown.

== Distribution ==
This marine species occurs off the Philippines, Mauritius, Sulawesi, Indonesia, and Western Australia.
