= Inquisitor latiriformis =

Scientific classification
- Kingdom: Animalia
- Phylum: Mollusca
- Class: Gastropoda
- Subclass: Caenogastropoda
- Order: Neogastropoda
- Superfamily: Conoidea
- Family: Pseudomelatomidae
- Genus: Inquisitor
- Species: I. latiriformis

Binomial name
- Inquisitor latiriformis Kilburn, 1988

Species of gastropod

Inquisitor latiriformis is a species of sea snail, a marine gastropod mollusk in the family Pseudomelatomidae, the turrids.

== Description ==
The length of the shell varies between 12 mm and 18 mm.

== Distribution ==
This marine species occurs off Zululand, South Africa.
