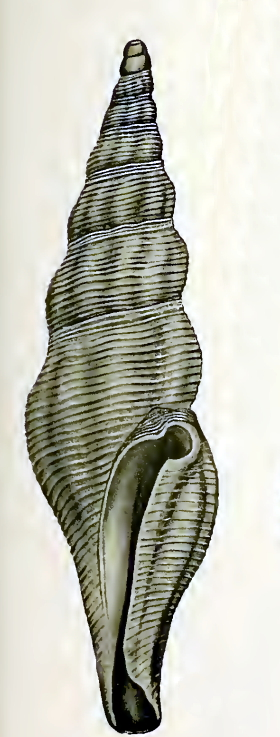
- Original image of a shell of Inquisitor hedleyi

Scientific classification
- Kingdom: Animalia
- Phylum: Mollusca
- Class: Gastropoda
- Subclass: Caenogastropoda
- Order: Neogastropoda
- Superfamily: Conoidea
- Family: Pseudomelatomidae
- Genus: Inquisitor
- Species: I. hedleyi

Binomial name
- Inquisitor hedleyi (Verco, 1909)

Synonyms
- Drillia hedleyi Verco, 1909

= Inquisitor hedleyi =

Species of gastropod

Inquisitor hedleyi is a species of sea snail, a marine gastropod mollusk in the family Pseudomelatomidae.

== Description ==
The length of the shell is 18.6 mm, and its diameter is 4.5 mm.

(Original description) The solid, narrow shell has an elongate-fusiform shape. It consists of 9 whorls, including the protoconch of 3 convex smooth whorls, with a deep impressed suture. The -whorls of the spire are convex, roundly angled below the middle in the early whorls, above it in the later, slightly adpressed below the linear suture. The body whorl is concavely attenuated at the base. The aperture is narrow, elongate-oval, ending in a moderately long open siphonal canal, which expands slightly in front, bends a little to the left, and is barely recurved. The outer lip is thick, sharp-edged, with a deep oblique posterior sinus of three-quarters of a circle, having a thickened reflected margin, and separated from the base of the whorl by a callous pad derived from the inner lip. Then it is straightly convex, with a wide, very shallow excavation at the base of the siphonal canal. The inner lip is complete, applied, and smooth. The columella is long and nearly straight. The axial ribs are oblique, fading out above the angle, rounded, nearly as wide as the spaces, ten in the penultimate whorl, absent from the base. The spiral lirae are crowded, fourteen in the penultimate, whorl, very close-set on the base, granulated by fine accremental striae. The colour in a fresh cotype is dull-white, with faint-brown clouding between the ribs, and a faint-brown band above the suture and round the periphery of the body whorl

== Distribution ==
This marine is endemic to Australia and occurs off South Australia.
