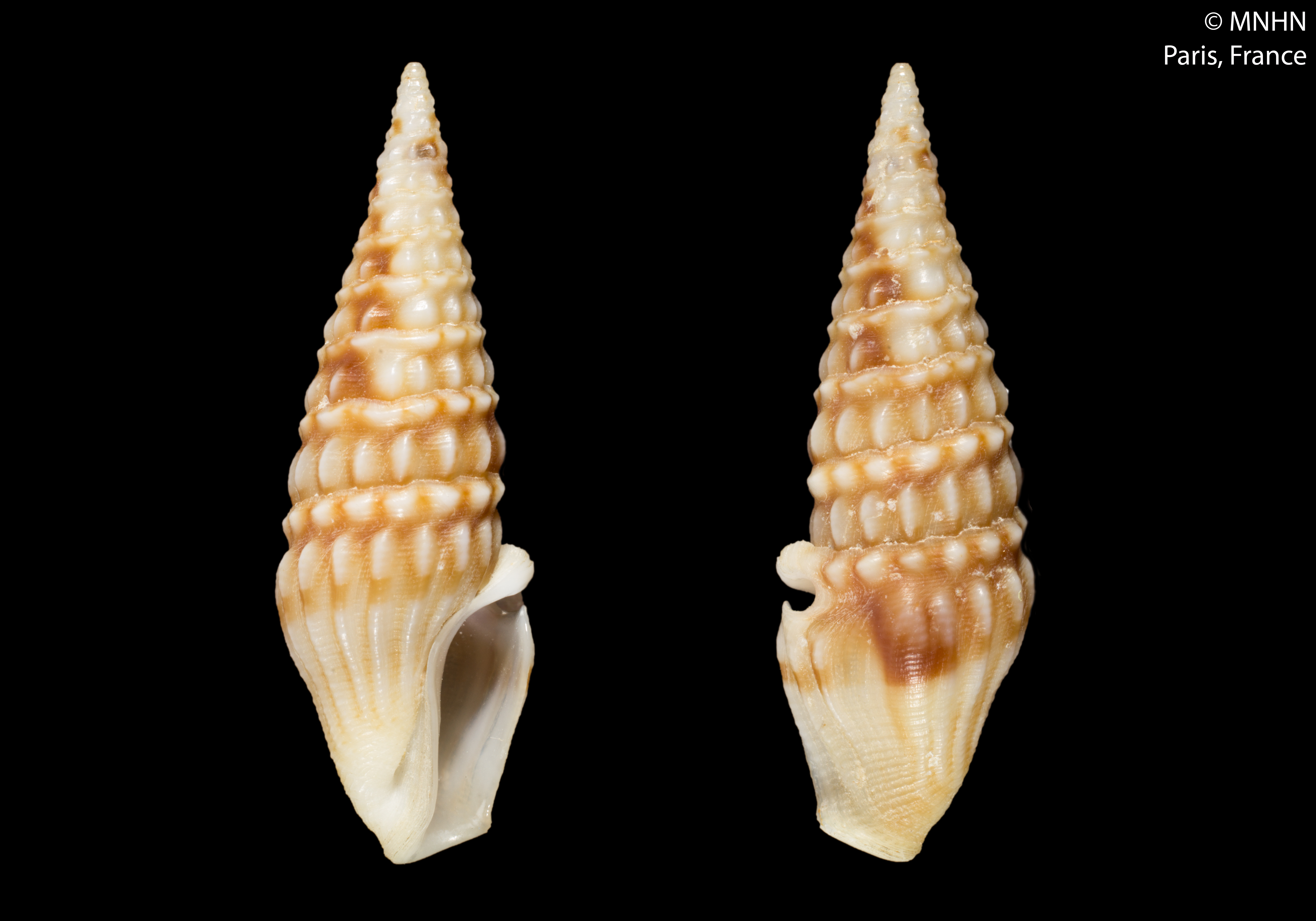

Scientific classification
- Kingdom: Animalia
- Phylum: Mollusca
- Class: Gastropoda
- Subclass: Caenogastropoda
- Order: Neogastropoda
- Superfamily: Conoidea
- Family: Pseudomelatomidae
- Genus: Inquisitor
- Species: I. hormophorus

Binomial name
- Inquisitor hormophorus Sysoev & Bouchet, 2001

= Inquisitor hormophorus =

Species of gastropod

Inquisitor hormophorus is a species of sea snail, a marine gastropod mollusk in the family Pseudomelatomidae, the turrids and allies.

== Distribution ==
This marine species occurs off the Norfolk Ridge, New Caledonia
