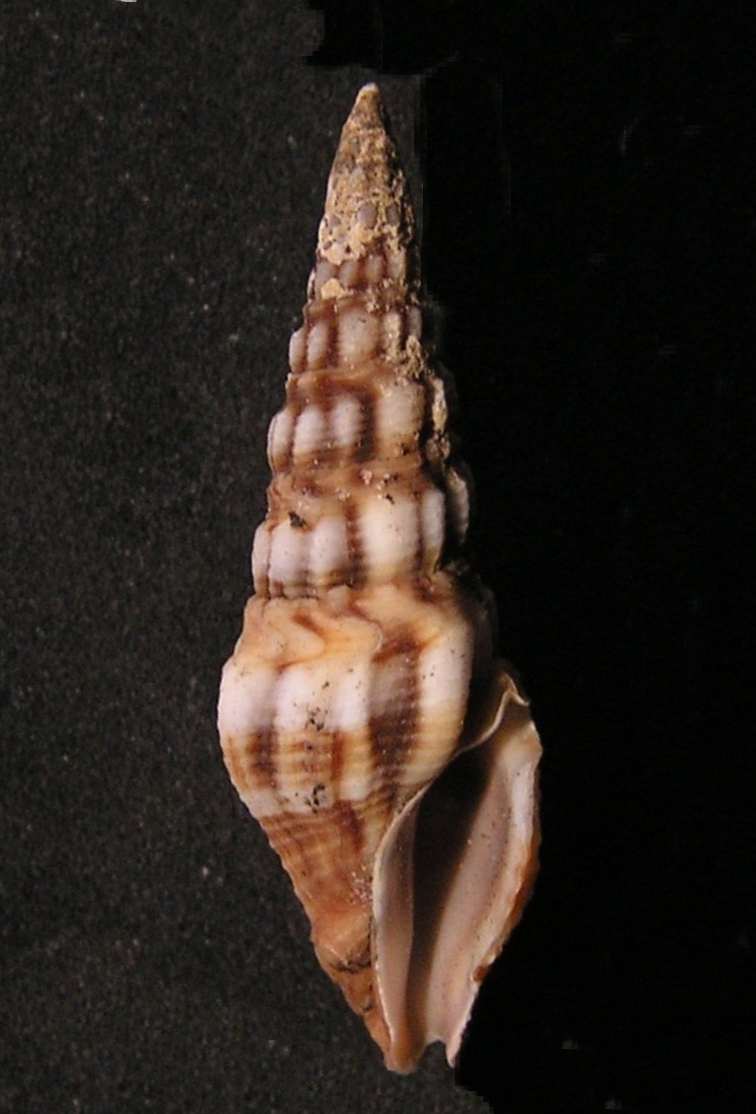
- Apertural view of a shell of Inquisitor sterrha

Scientific classification
- Kingdom: Animalia
- Phylum: Mollusca
- Class: Gastropoda
- Subclass: Caenogastropoda
- Order: Neogastropoda
- Superfamily: Conoidea
- Family: Pseudomelatomidae
- Genus: Inquisitor
- Species: I. sterrhus

Binomial name
- Inquisitor sterrhus (Watson, 1881)

Synonyms
- Drillia sinensis Brazier, 1876; Drillia sterrha (Watson, 1881); Drillia torresiana (Smith, 1884); Inquisitor sterrha (Watson, 1881); Pleurotoma sterrha Watson, 1881; Pleurotoma torresiana Smith, E.A. 1884

= Inquisitor sterrhus =

Species of gastropod

Inquisitor sterrhus, commonly known as the formidable turrid, is a species of sea snail, a marine gastropod mollusc in the family Pseudomelatomidae.

== Description ==
The length of this species is 39 mm, its diameter 13 mm.

The body whorl contains in one specimen fourteen ribs, in another specimen seventeen ribs.

== Distribution ==
This marine species occurs in the Central Indo-Pacific; the Gulf of Carpentaria, off Queensland, Australia; off the Philippines; southern Indonesia and southern Papua New Guinea.
