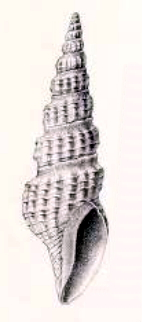
- Original image of a shell of Inquisitor elachystoma

Scientific classification
- Kingdom: Animalia
- Phylum: Mollusca
- Class: Gastropoda
- Subclass: Caenogastropoda
- Order: Neogastropoda
- Superfamily: Conoidea
- Family: Pseudomelatomidae
- Genus: Inquisitor
- Species: I. elachystoma

Binomial name
- Inquisitor elachystoma (Martens, 1901)

Synonyms
- Drillia elachystoma (Martens, 1901); Pleurotoma elachystoma Martens, 1901; Pleurotoma (Drillia) elachystoma (Martens, 1901)

= Inquisitor elachystoma =

Species of gastropod

Inquisitor elachystoma is a species of sea snail, a marine gastropod mollusk in the family Pseudomelatomidae, the turrids and allies.

== Description ==
The length of the shell varies between 40 mm and 70 mm.

== Distribution ==
This marine species occurs off Japan and in the East China Sea; also off the Philippines and East Africa.
