= Inquisitor mastersi =

Scientific classification
- Kingdom: Animalia
- Phylum: Mollusca
- Class: Gastropoda
- Subclass: Caenogastropoda
- Order: Neogastropoda
- Superfamily: Conoidea
- Family: Pseudomelatomidae
- Genus: Inquisitor
- Species: I. mastersi

Binomial name
- Inquisitor mastersi (Brazier, 1876)

Synonyms
- Drillia mastersi Brazier, 1876 (original combination); Pleurotoma (Drillia) essingtonensis E. A. Smith, 1888; Pleurotoma essingtonensis E. A. Smith, 1888

Species of gastropod

Inquisitor mastersi is a species of sea snail, a marine gastropod mollusk in the family Pseudomelatomidae.

== Taxonomy ==
Wells (1994) excluded mastersi from Inquisitor, but did not suggest an alternative generic allocation. It is thus here kept provisionally in Inquisitor

== Description ==
The reddish brown, solid shell is ovate and depressly flattened at the upper part. It contains 8, transversely sculptured, whorls. The centre of the upper whorls is tuberculated, spotted with white, the last longitudinally rather obliquely ribbed. At the angle they become more like prickly nodules, below somewhat white. The suture is minutely spirally striated. The outer lip is simple, brownish in centre, having an obsolete white sinus below. The upper sinus is white, deep, and wide, with a thick deposit of callus on the body whorl, and extending down in a thin plate to the columellar. The siphonal canal is very short and wide. (described as Drillia mastersi Brazier, 1876).

== Distribution ==
This marine species is endemic to Australia and occurs off Northern Territory, Queensland.
