= Inquisitor ischnos =

Scientific classification
- Kingdom: Animalia
- Phylum: Mollusca
- Class: Gastropoda
- Subclass: Caenogastropoda
- Order: Neogastropoda
- Superfamily: Conoidea
- Family: Pseudomelatomidae
- Genus: Inquisitor
- Species: †I. ischnos

Binomial name
- †Inquisitor ischnos (Philippi, 1887)

Synonyms
- † Fusus ischnos Philippi, 1887

Extinct species of gastropod

Inquisitor ischnos is an extinct species of sea snail, a marine gastropod mollusk in the family Pseudomelatomidae, the turrids and allies.

== Description ==
The length of the shell attains 30.5 mm.

== Distribution ==
This extinct marine species was found in Miocene strata of Central Chile.
