= Inquisitor angustiliratus =

Scientific classification
- Kingdom: Animalia
- Phylum: Mollusca
- Class: Gastropoda
- Subclass: Caenogastropoda
- Order: Neogastropoda
- Superfamily: Conoidea
- Family: Pseudomelatomidae
- Genus: Inquisitor
- Species: I. angustiliratus

Binomial name
- Inquisitor angustiliratus Sysoev, 1996

Species of gastropod

Inquisitor angustiliratus is a species of sea snail, a marine gastropod in the family Pseudomelatomidae, the turrids and allies.

== Description ==
The length of the shell attains 39.5 mm, its diameter 10.8 mm.

== Distribution ==
This species occurs in the Gulf of Aden.
