= Inquisitor vividus =

Scientific classification
- Kingdom: Animalia
- Phylum: Mollusca
- Class: Gastropoda
- Subclass: Caenogastropoda
- Order: Neogastropoda
- Superfamily: Conoidea
- Family: Pseudomelatomidae
- Genus: Inquisitor
- Species: I. vividus

Binomial name
- Inquisitor vividus Li B. Q., Kilburn & Li X. Z., 2010

Species of gastropod

Inquisitor vividus is a species of sea snail, a marine gastropod mollusk in the family Pseudomelatomidae, the turrids and allies.

== Description ==
The length of the shell attains 23.2 mm, its diameter 7 mm.

== Distribution ==
This marine species occurs in the South China Sea.
