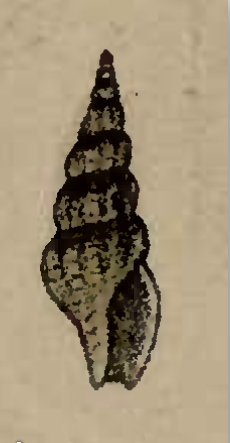
- Drawing of a shell of Inquisitor nagasakiensis

Scientific classification
- Kingdom: Animalia
- Phylum: Mollusca
- Class: Gastropoda
- Subclass: Caenogastropoda
- Order: Neogastropoda
- Superfamily: Conoidea
- Family: Pseudomelatomidae
- Genus: Inquisitor
- Species: I. nagasakiensis

Binomial name
- Inquisitor nagasakiensis (E.A. Smith, 1879)

Synonyms
- Clathurella nagasakiensis E.A. Smith, 1879; Drillia nagasakiensis E.A. Smith, 1879; Turridrupa nagasakiensis (E. A. Smith, 1879) superseded combination

= Inquisitor nagasakiensis =

Species of gastropod

Inquisitor nagasakiensis is a species of sea snail, a marine gastropod mollusk in the family Pseudomelatomidae.

== Description ==
(Original description) The elongate shell is turreted and luteous. It contains 9 whorls: two apical brown, smooth, convex; the rest keeled above at the suture, somewhat excavated beneath the carina, then convex at the sides, which contract inwards towards the base. They are closely ribbed and transversely grooved. The ribs are rounded and oblique, sixteen on the penultimate whorl and do not quite attain to the suture, but become obsolete in the sloping concavity above. The spiral ridges between the sulci number eight on the penultimate whorl. Of these the three uppermost are very fine and situated in the concavity above, the rest are much coarser and subnodulous on the ribs. The latter are attenuated inferiorly on the last whorl, and become obsolete a little below the middle. One of them near the tip is considerably enlarged in the form of a varix. The spiral sulcation also extends over the entire surface. The aperture is rather small, occupying a third of the entire length, light brown within. The outer lip is thin, much produced and arcuated at the middle, broadly and deeply notched a little below the suture, and with a second shallow sinuation near the base. The columella is suberect, smooth, coated with a thin callosity, terminating above at the sinus in the form of a tubercle. The siphonal canal is short, broad, but little recurved.

The yellowish brown shell is closely sculptured by longitudinal numerous ribs and spiral striae. There is a very slight concave constriction below the sutures. The aperture is rather small, light brown within. The outer lip is thin.

== Distribution ==
This marine species occurs off Japan.
