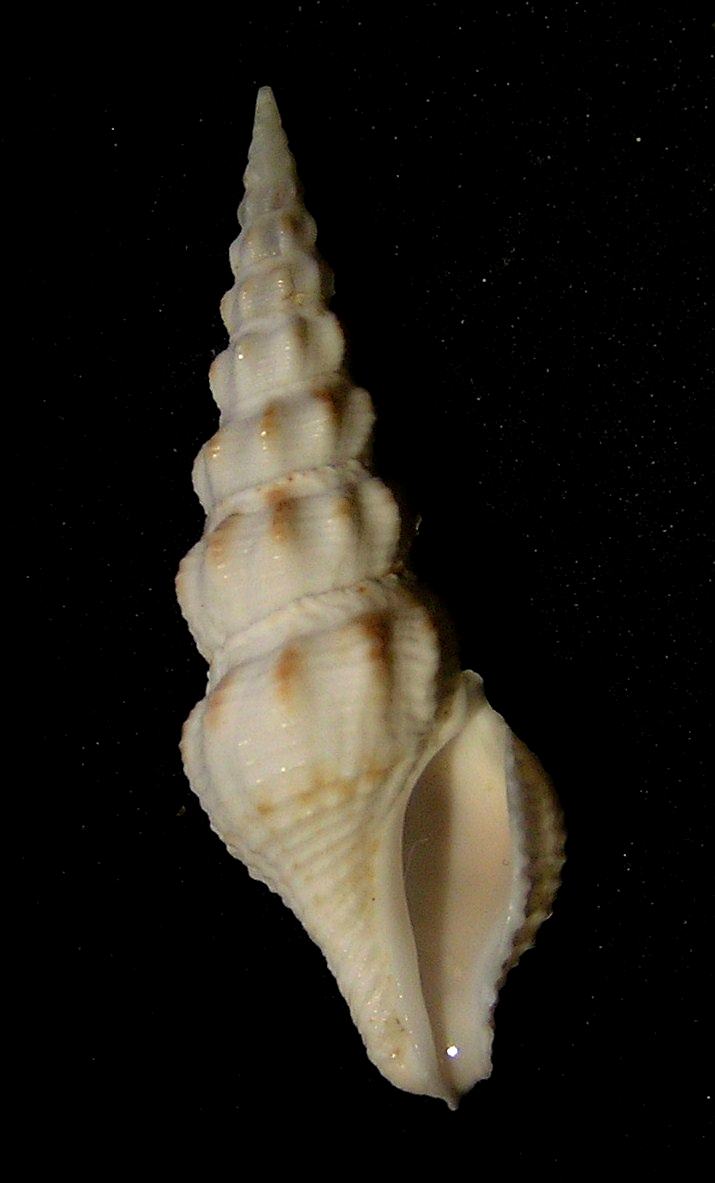
- Apertural view of a shell of Inquisitor formidabilis

Scientific classification
- Kingdom: Animalia
- Phylum: Mollusca
- Class: Gastropoda
- Subclass: Caenogastropoda
- Order: Neogastropoda
- Superfamily: Conoidea
- Family: Pseudomelatomidae
- Genus: Inquisitor
- Species: I. formidabilis

Binomial name
- Inquisitor formidabilis Hedley, 1922

Synonyms
- Funa formidabilis (Hedley, 1922)

= Inquisitor formidabilis =

Species of gastropod

Inquisitor formidabilis is a species of sea snail, a marine gastropod mollusk in the family Pseudomelatomidae, the turrids and allies.

== Description ==
The length of the shell attains 51 mm, its diameter 15 mm.

(Original description) The shell is large but comparatively thin, fusiform, subturreted and sharply pointed. The spire is produced. The base of the shell is contracted. The shell contains 13 whorls . Its colour is grey-buff, maculated with chestnut at the sutures.

Sculpture:—The radials are oblique, wide-spaced, consisting of low peripheral nodular riblets, ten on the penultimate, and eleven on the body whorl . On the earlier whorls the ribs ascend the spire perpendicularly and continuously, but on the lower whorls they are less developed and less regular. There is a secondary sculpture of fine radial threads which sometimes crowd the interstitial spaces of the spirals. On the body whorl are about thirty-two broad spiral cords, and on the penultimate ten. In their interstices one or more spiral threads may arise. A funicular rib on the anterior end of the shell encloses a small false umbilicus. The fasciole is broad, and is appressed to the suture. It is smooth save for crescentic growth lines.

Aperture :—The sinus is wide and V-shaped. The outer lip is arched forwards, and the free sharp edge is bent inwards a little towards the aperture. Opposite the base of the siphonal canal is a stromboid inflection. The siphonal canal is short, wide, and sharply recurved. The columella is overspread with a thick callus rising in a low tubercle opposite the sinus.

== Distribution ==
This marine species is endemic to Australia and occurs off Queensland.
