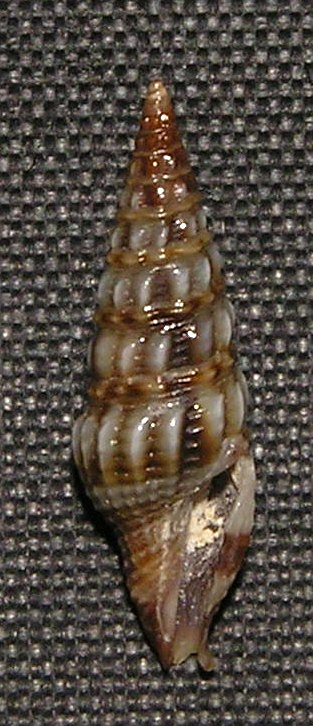
- Apertural view of a shell of Inquisitor solomonensis

Scientific classification
- Kingdom: Animalia
- Phylum: Mollusca
- Class: Gastropoda
- Subclass: Caenogastropoda
- Order: Neogastropoda
- Superfamily: Conoidea
- Family: Pseudomelatomidae
- Genus: Inquisitor
- Species: I. solomonensis

Binomial name
- Inquisitor solomonensis (E. A. Smith, 1876)

Synonyms
- Pleurotoma solomonensis E. A. Smith, 1876 (original combination); Turris solomonensis (E. A. Smith, 1876)

= Inquisitor solomonensis =

Species of gastropod

Inquisitor solomonensis is a species of sea snail, a marine gastropod mollusk in the family Pseudomelatomidae, the turrids and allies.

== Description ==
The length of the shell varies between 20 mm and 27 mm; its diameter 6.2 mm.

(Original description in Latin) The shell is fusiform, subturrited, and whitish, ornamented between the ribs with longitudinal blackish-brown streaks and with small brown dots below the suture. It has 13 whorls. The first two are smooth. The later whorls are bordered below the suture by an elevated keel; beneath this keel they are concave, angular in the middle, and obliquely narrowed below. They bear 9–10 ribs, which are angular in the middle and gradually fade upward toward the keel, and they are sculptured between the ribs with 5–6 transverse striae. The body whorl narrows toward the base; its ribs become attenuated below, are somewhat distant behind the lip, and are sometimes accompanied by other smaller ribs in the interspaces near the base.

The aperture is elongated, very narrow, white, and marked with longitudinal brown streaks; it occupies about two-fifths of the total shell length. The outer lip projects in the middle, is moderately sinuate above, and very slightly sinuate near the base. The columella is nearly straight, not arched, thinly calloused, and armed at the suture with a rather strong tubercle. The siphonal canal is narrow, slightly elongated, almost straight, and only weakly recurved.

== Distribution ==
This marine species occurs off New Guinea, the Philippines, and the Solomon Islands and the Fiji Islands.
