= Inquisitor stenos =

Scientific classification
- Kingdom: Animalia
- Phylum: Mollusca
- Class: Gastropoda
- Subclass: Caenogastropoda
- Order: Neogastropoda
- Superfamily: Conoidea
- Family: Pseudomelatomidae
- Genus: Inquisitor
- Species: I. stenos

Binomial name
- Inquisitor stenos Sysoev, 1996

Species of gastropod

Inquisitor stenos is a species of sea snail, a marine gastropod mollusk in the family Pseudomelatomidae, the turrids and allies.

== Description ==
The length of the shell attains 21.3 mm, its diameter 5.7 mm.

== Distribution ==
This marine species is distributed throughout the Gulf of Aden.
