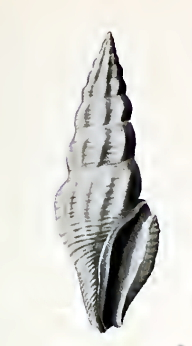
- Original image of a shell of Inquisitor flindersianus

Scientific classification
- Kingdom: Animalia
- Phylum: Mollusca
- Class: Gastropoda
- Subclass: Caenogastropoda
- Order: Neogastropoda
- Superfamily: Conoidea
- Family: Pseudomelatomidae
- Genus: Inquisitor
- Species: I. flindersianus

Binomial name
- Inquisitor flindersianus Hedley, 1922

Synonyms
- Pleurotoma alabaster Brazier, 1876

= Inquisitor flindersianus =

Species of gastropod

Inquisitor flindersianus is a species of sea snail, a marine gastropod mollusk in the family Pseudomelatomidae, the turrids and allies.

== Description ==
The length of the shell attains 31 mm, its diameter 11 mm.

(Original description) The rather large and solid shell has a slender fusiform shape. Its contains eleven whorls. Its colour is ochraceous-salmon, with a pale zone on the shoulder.

Sculpture : The fasciole slightly excavate, crossed by crescentic lines, and traversed by fine threads. The ribs are discontinuous, oblique, widely spaced, round-backed, bolder on the upper whorls, disappearing on the ventral side of the body whorl, but re-appearing on the dorsal . They are set at twelve to a whorl. The spirals are flat-topped cords which override the ribs—about twenty-two on the body whorl and five or seven on the upper whorls. Their furrows are crossed by microscopic hairlines, and often traversed by an interstitial thread.

Aperture :—The mouth is narrow. The varix is broad and low, about its own breadth within the edge of the free flap which stretches across the mouth. The sinus is deep, oblique, narrowed at the entrance. The columella is straight. The inner lip has a raised margin. The short siphonal canal is open.

== Distribution ==
This marine species is endemic to Australia and occurs off Queensland
