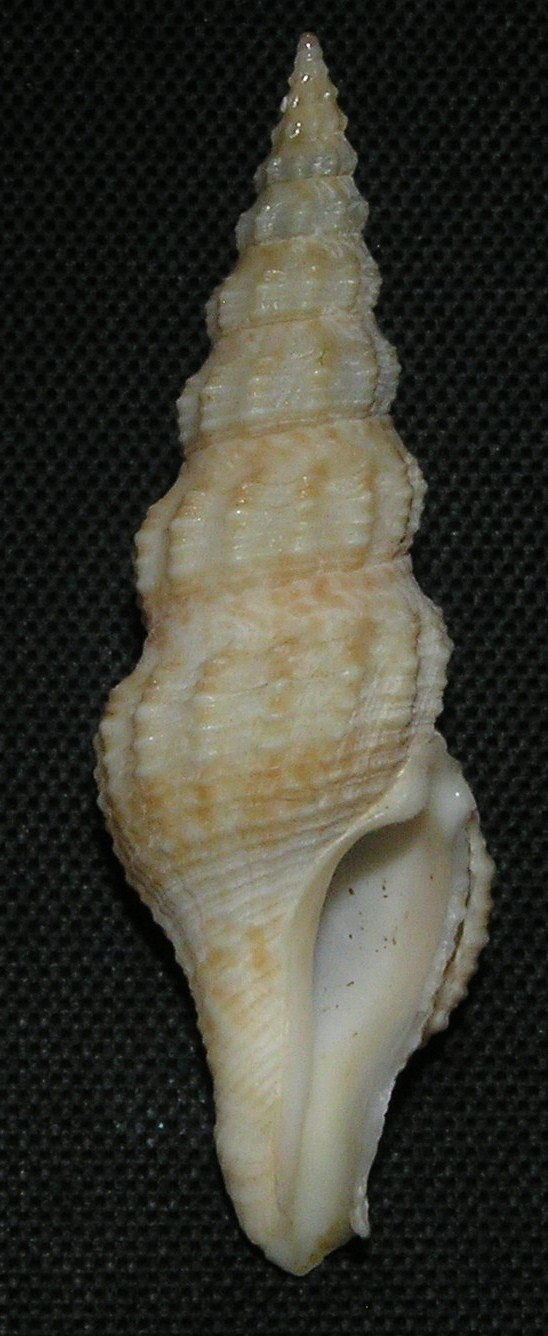
- Apertural view of a shell of Inquisitor dampieria

Scientific classification
- Kingdom: Animalia
- Phylum: Mollusca
- Class: Gastropoda
- Subclass: Caenogastropoda
- Order: Neogastropoda
- Superfamily: Conoidea
- Family: Pseudomelatomidae
- Genus: Inquisitor
- Species: I. dampieria

Binomial name
- Inquisitor dampieria (Hedley, 1922)

Synonyms
- Inquisitor dampierius (Hedley, 1922); Melatoma dampieria Hedley, 1922 (original combination); Splendrillia dampieria (Hedley, 1922)

= Inquisitor dampieria =

Species of sea snail

Inquisitor dampieria is a species of sea snail, a marine gastropod mollusk in the family Pseudomelatomidae.

== Description ==
The length of the shell attains 30 mm, its diameter 9 mm.

(Original description) The slender long, and solid shell has a lanceolate shape. Its colour is uniform livid-brown to russet- vinaceous. The shell contains 11 whorls, including a mucronate protoconch of two whorls. The surface in general polished. The fasciole is a broad and rather deeply sunken furrow, crossed by fine concentric growth lines, and traversed by a median sulcus. Above it runs a prominent subsutural ridge. Between the fasciole and the anterior end are twenty-two spiral grooves, which grow wider and deeper towards the base, and smaller and more crowded on the snout. The radial ribs are seventeen to a whorl, prominent on the shoulder, and gradually vanishing towards the base, higher on the penultimate, and decreasing towards the aperture. The aperture is pyriform. The outer lip is simple. The sinus is U-shaped and rather large. A boss of callus appears near the insertion of the lip and a separate sheet of callus on the lower columella. The siphonal canal is short and wide.

== Distribution ==
This marine species is endemic to Australia and occurs off Western Australia.
