= Inquisitor powelli =

Scientific classification
- Kingdom: Animalia
- Phylum: Mollusca
- Class: Gastropoda
- Subclass: Caenogastropoda
- Order: Neogastropoda
- Superfamily: Conoidea
- Family: Pseudomelatomidae
- Genus: Inquisitor
- Species: I. powelli

Binomial name
- Inquisitor powelli (Dell, 1950)

Synonyms
- † Pseudoinquisitor powelli Dell, 1950 (original combination)

Extinct species of gastropod

Inquisitor powelli is an extinct species of sea snail, a marine gastropod mollusk in the family Pseudomelatomidae, the turrids and allies.

== Description ==
The length (estimated) attains 22 mm, its diameter is 6 mm.

== Distribution ==
This extinct marine species was found in New Zealand.
