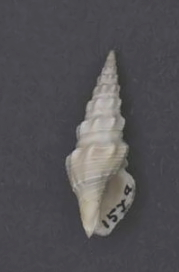
- Apertural view of a shell of Inquisitor incertus (museum specimen at Naturalis Biodiversity Center)

Scientific classification
- Kingdom: Animalia
- Phylum: Mollusca
- Class: Gastropoda
- Subclass: Caenogastropoda
- Order: Neogastropoda
- Superfamily: Conoidea
- Family: Pseudomelatomidae
- Genus: Inquisitor
- Species: I. incertus

Binomial name
- Inquisitor incertus (E. A. Smith, 1877)

Synonyms
- Brachytoma incerta Gravely, 1942; Drillia incerta (E. A. Smith, 1877); Pleurotoma (Drillia) incerta E. A. Smith, 1877 (basionym); Pleurotoma incerta E. A. Smith, 1877 (original combination)

= Inquisitor incertus =

Species of gastropod

Inquisitor incertus is a species of sea snail, a marine gastropod mollusk in the family Pseudomelatomidae, the turrids and allies.

== Description ==
The length of the shell of the shell attains 25 mm, its diameter 7 mm.

The white shell has a fusiform shape. It contains 12 whorls, of which two in the protoconch. These two are vitreous and convex. The others are convex and crossed by opisthocline ribs. The sutures are almost obsolete. The spiral lirations in this species are about six in number in the upper whorls, and twenty in the body whorl. They do not exist in the depression at the upper part of the whorls, which is only finely striated. The oval aperture measures about 3/7the of the length of the shell. The sharp outer lip has a crenulated margin. The columella is almost straight, anteriorly attenuated, with very little callus. The siphonal canal is slightly elongated and recurved.

== Distribution ==
This marine species occurs off India to New Guinea. It has also been found off Zanzibar.
