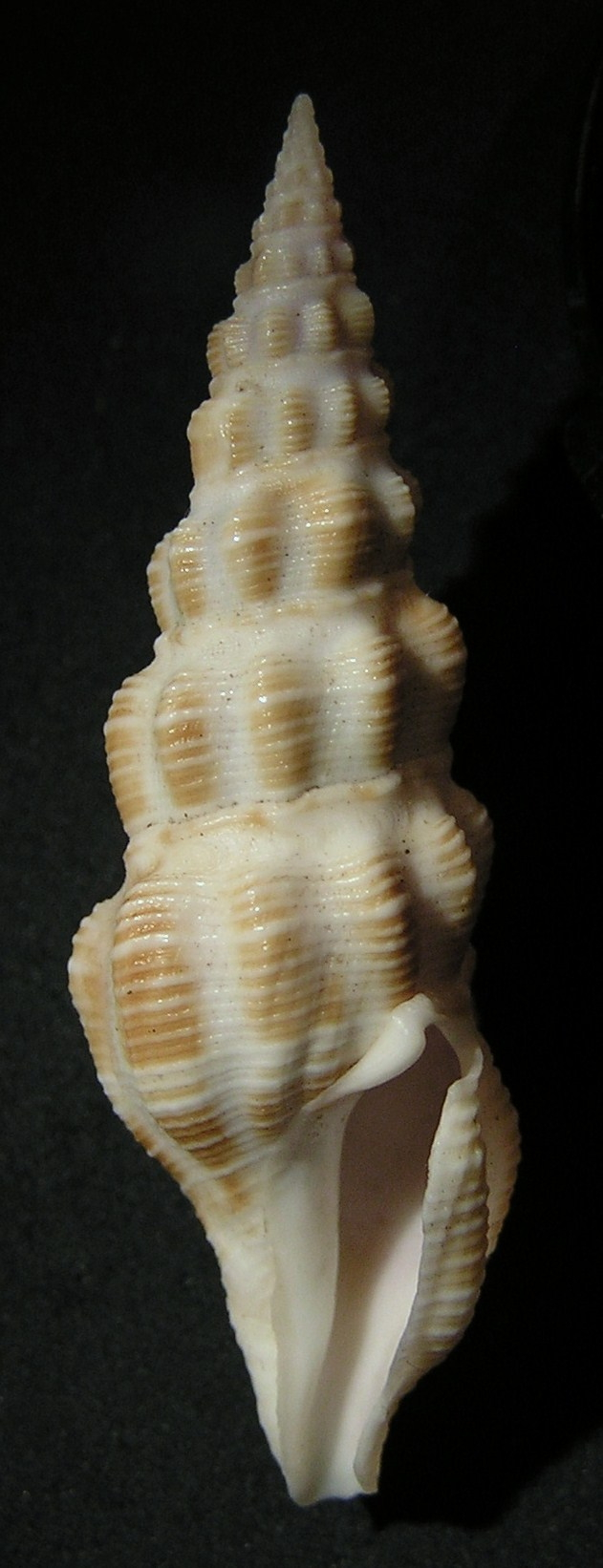
- Apertural view of a shell of Inquisitor exiguus

Scientific classification
- Kingdom: Animalia
- Phylum: Mollusca
- Class: Gastropoda
- Subclass: Caenogastropoda
- Order: Neogastropoda
- Superfamily: Conoidea
- Family: Pseudomelatomidae
- Genus: Inquisitor
- Species: I. exiguus

Binomial name
- Inquisitor exiguus (Kuroda & Oyama, 1971)

Synonyms
- Pseudoinquisitor exiguus Kuroda & Oyama, 1971

= Inquisitor exiguus =

Species of gastropod

Inquisitor exiguus is a species of sea snail, a marine gastropod mollusk in the family Pseudomelatomidae, the turrids and allies.

== Description ==
The length of the shell varies between 50 mm and 70 mm.

== Distribution ==
This marine species occurs off the Philippines and Japan.
