= Inquisitor zebra =

Scientific classification
- Kingdom: Animalia
- Phylum: Mollusca
- Class: Gastropoda
- Subclass: Caenogastropoda
- Order: Neogastropoda
- Superfamily: Conoidea
- Family: Pseudomelatomidae
- Genus: Inquisitor
- Species: I. zebra

Binomial name
- Inquisitor zebra (Lamarck, 1822)

Synonyms
- Buccinum zebra Lamarck, 1822; Pleurotoma zebra (Lamarck, 1822); Pleurotoma (Crassispira) zebra (Lamarck, 1822)

Species of gastropod

Inquisitor zebra is a species of sea snail, a marine gastropod mollusk in the family Pseudomelatomidae, the turrids and allies.

== Description ==
The length of the shell attains 10 mm

== Distribution ==
This marine species occurs in the Indian Ocean off Réunion and also in the China Seas.
