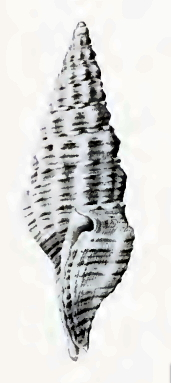
- Original image of a shell of Inquisitor lassulus

Scientific classification
- Kingdom: Animalia
- Phylum: Mollusca
- Class: Gastropoda
- Subclass: Caenogastropoda
- Order: Neogastropoda
- Superfamily: Conoidea
- Family: Pseudomelatomidae
- Genus: Inquisitor
- Species: I. lassulus

Binomial name
- Inquisitor lassulus Hedley, 1922

Synonyms
- Brachytoma alma Thiele, J., 1930; Drillia varicosa Brazier, 1876

= Inquisitor lassulus =

Species of gastropod

Inquisitor lassulus is a species of sea snail, a marine gastropod mollusk in the family Pseudomelatomidae.

== Description ==
The length of the shell attains 13 mm, its diameter 7 mm.

(Original description) The solid shell is of moderate size. It is rather glossy and fusiform. Its colour is buff, chequered with ochre-red, disposed irregularly, though alternate segments of red and buff on the subsutural cord seems a constant feature; usually the snout, the fasciole, and a narrow supra-basal zone are buff, while the intercostal spaces and a broad basal zone are red. The shell consists of 10 whorls, of which two include the protoconch.

Sculpture:—A prominent undulating cord runs beneath the suture, and is followed by a rather narrow fasciole with a median groove. The ribs may, or may not, swell at irregular intervals into varices—they are stout, perpendicular, discontinuous, persistent on the body whorl, and reach to the base; they are set at about eleven to the whorl. The spirals are flat-topped cords, their width apart, more prominent in the interspaces than on the ribs Their interstices and sometimes themselves are crossed by a secondary sculpture of fine radial threads, excluding the subsutural spiral. There are fourteen on the body whorl, and two or three on the earlier whorls.

Aperture:—The aperture is narrow. The last varix is twice its breadth behind the edge of the lip. The sinus is open, wide, and deep. The columella is straight. The inner lip shows a raised margin. The siphonal canal is produced and recurved.

== Distribution ==
This marine species is endemic to Australia and occurs off Northern Territory, Queensland and Western Australia.
