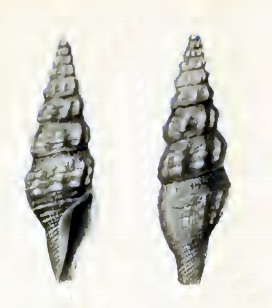
- Original image of a shell of Inquisitor subangusta

Scientific classification
- Kingdom: Animalia
- Phylum: Mollusca
- Class: Gastropoda
- Subclass: Caenogastropoda
- Order: Neogastropoda
- Superfamily: Conoidea
- Family: Pseudomelatomidae
- Genus: Inquisitor
- Species: I. subangusta

Binomial name
- Inquisitor subangusta (Schepman, 1913)

Synonyms
- Drillia subangusta Schepman, 1913

= Inquisitor subangusta =

Species of gastropod

Inquisitor subangusta is a species of sea snail, a marine gastropod mollusk in the family Pseudomelatomidae, the turrids and allies.

== Description ==
The length of the shell attains 15 mm, its diameter 2 mm.

(Original description) The narrowly elongate shell is fusiform and very light yellowish white. It contains 9 whorls, of which about 1½ form a slightly swollen, smooth protoconch; The subsequent whorls are convex, separated by an undulated suture, which is accompanied by a spiral rib, conspicuous on upper whorls, becoming fainter lower on, nearly disappearing towards body whorl . The upper part of the whorls show a rather narrow excavation, wider but shallower on the lower whorls. This excavation is sculptured with waved concentric striae and very fine spiral striae. The lower part of the whorls show strong rounded ribs, 10 on the body whorl, crossed by from 3 to 4 spiral lirae on the lower whorls, 19 on the body whorl, of which the upper 6 are more remote. The lower ones on the base of the shell and on the siphonal canal are crowded. On the ribs the upper lirae are beadlike, then the ribs disappear. The aperture is narrowly elongated. The peristome is broken. The upper sinus is probably wide. The columellar margin is slightly concave above, with a tubercle at the sinus, straight below. The siphonal canal is wide, slightly upturned. The interior of the aperture is white.

== Distribution ==
This marine species occurs off Indonesia
