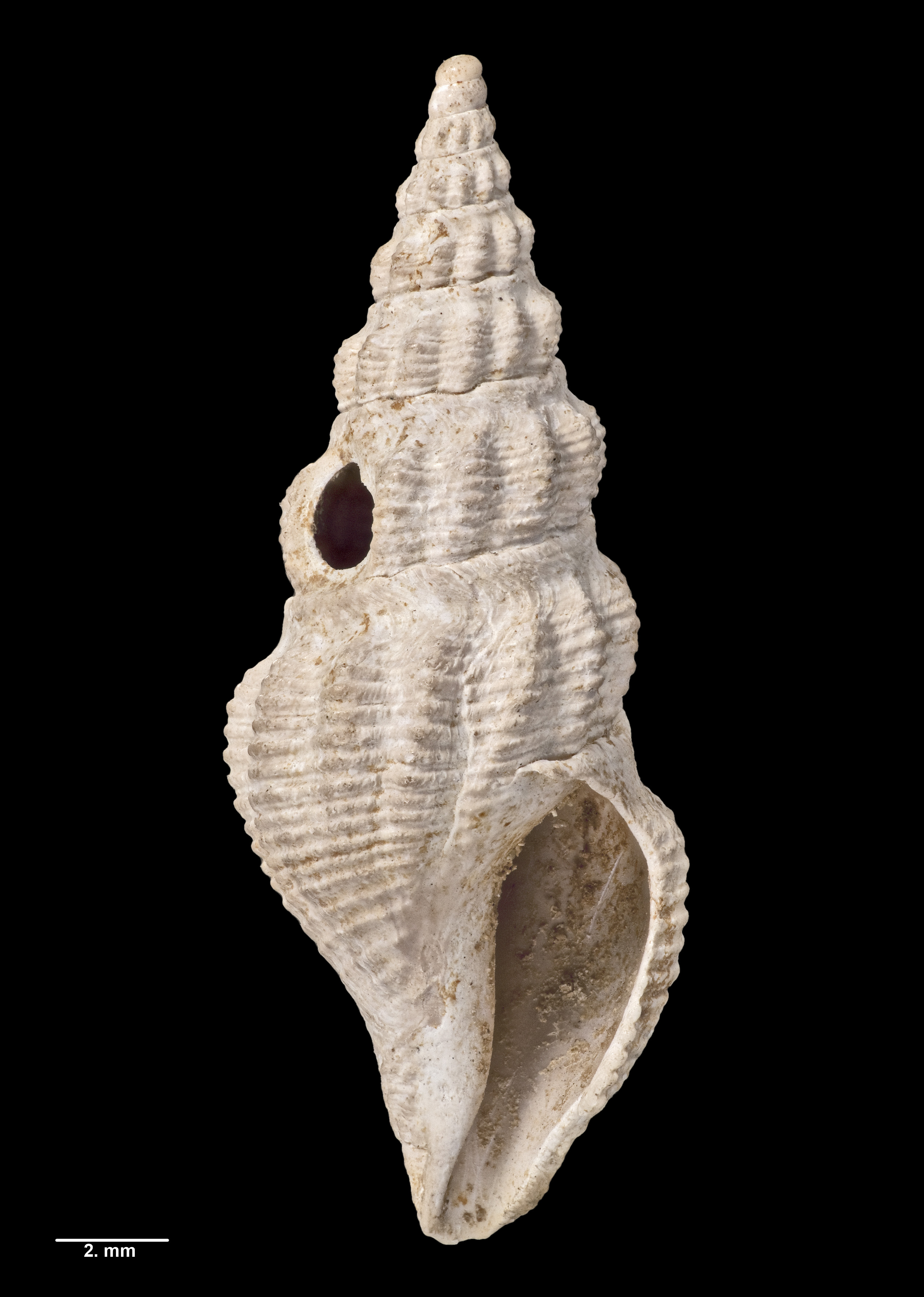
- Holotype from Auckland War Memorial Museum

Scientific classification
- Kingdom: Animalia
- Phylum: Mollusca
- Class: Gastropoda
- Subclass: Caenogastropoda
- Order: Neogastropoda
- Family: Pseudomelatomidae
- Genus: Inquisitor
- Species: †I. scabriculus

Binomial name
- †Inquisitor scabriculus (A. W. B. Powell, 1944)

Synonyms
- Pseudoinquisitor scabriculus A. W. B. Powell, 1944

= Inquisitor scabriculus =

Inquisitor scabriculus Temporal range: late Miocene–early Pliocene

Extinct species of gastropod

Inquisitor scabriculus is an extinct species of sea snail, a marine gastropod mollusc, in the family Pseudomelatomidae. Fossils of the species date to either the late Miocene or early Pliocene strata of the Gippsland Basin of Victoria, Australia.

== Description ==
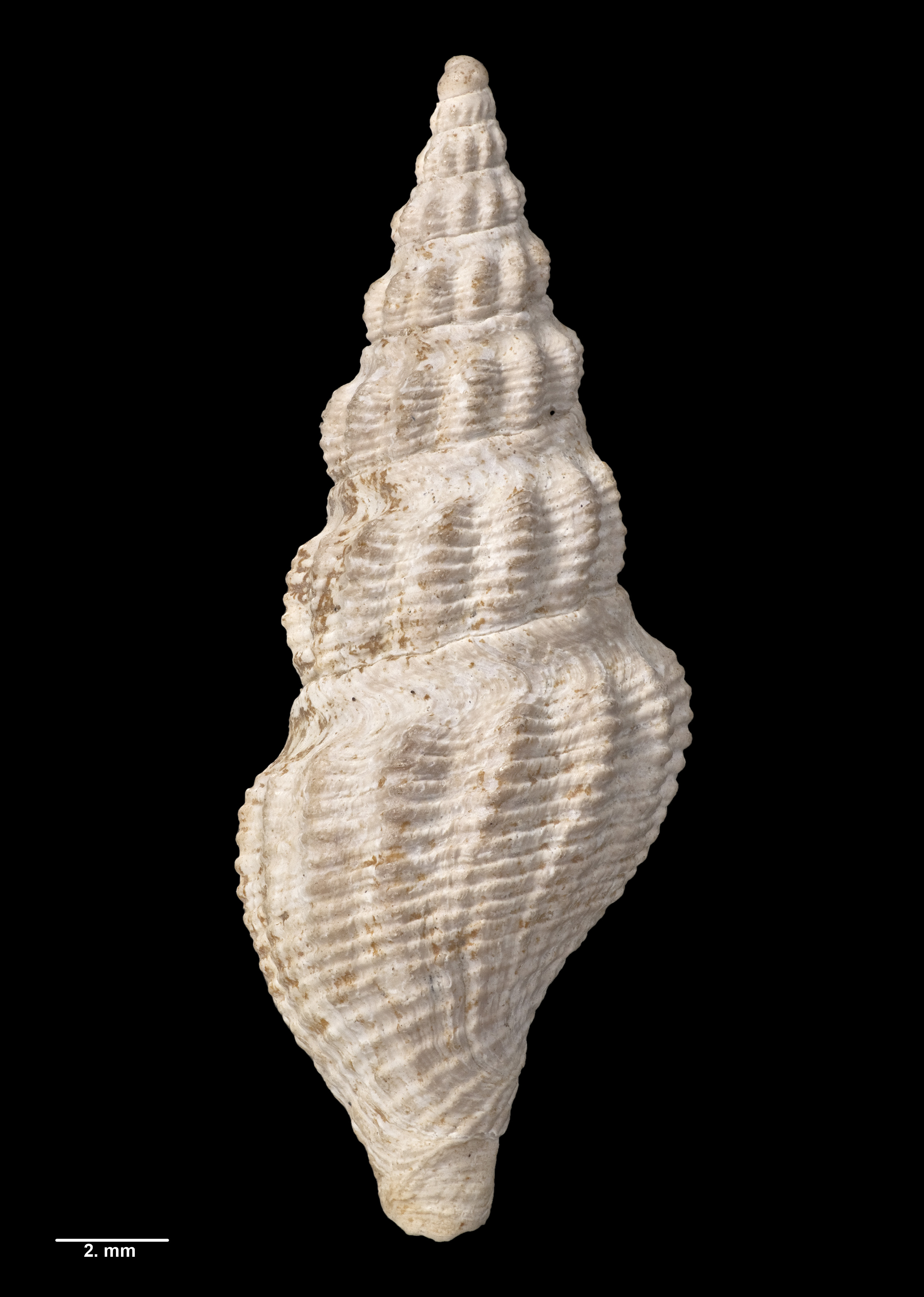
Reverse view of holotype

In the original description, Powell described the species as follows:

Shell rather large. Axial and spiral sculpture both well developed, subsutural fold weak to obsolescent. Periphery above middle, rounded, shoulder deeply concave. Axials broadly rounded, 14 per whorl, subobsolete over base, crossed by coarse linear-spaced spiral cords, 6-8 on spire-whorls and about 21 on body-whorl and base. The concave shoulder bears indistinct spiral threads.

The holotype of the species measures 21 mm (0.83 in) in length and has a diameter of 7.6 mm (0.30 in).

== Taxonomy ==
The species was first described by A. W. B. Powell in 1944 as Pseudoinquisitor scabriculus. Powell recombined the species as Inquisitor scabriculus in 1966, a move that malacologist Thomas A. Darragh agreed with in 1970. The holotype was collected from the Gippsland Lakes, Victoria, Australia at an unknown date prior to 1937 as a part of the Finlay Collection, and is held by the Auckland War Memorial Museum.

== Distribution ==
This extinct marine species occurs in strata of the Gippsland Basin of Victoria, Australia, including the Jemmys Point Formation, and likely dates to the late Miocene or early Pliocene.
