= Inquisitor adenicus =

Scientific classification
- Kingdom: Animalia
- Phylum: Mollusca
- Class: Gastropoda
- Subclass: Caenogastropoda
- Order: Neogastropoda
- Superfamily: Conoidea
- Family: Pseudomelatomidae
- Genus: Inquisitor
- Species: I. adenicus

Binomial name
- Inquisitor adenicus Sysoev, 1996

Species of gastropod

Inquisitor adenicus is a species of sea snail, a marine gastropod mollusk in the family Pseudomelatomidae, the turrids and allies.

== Description ==
The length of the shell attains 33 mm, its diameter 10.3 mm.

== Distribution ==
This marine species occurs in the Gulf of Aden.
