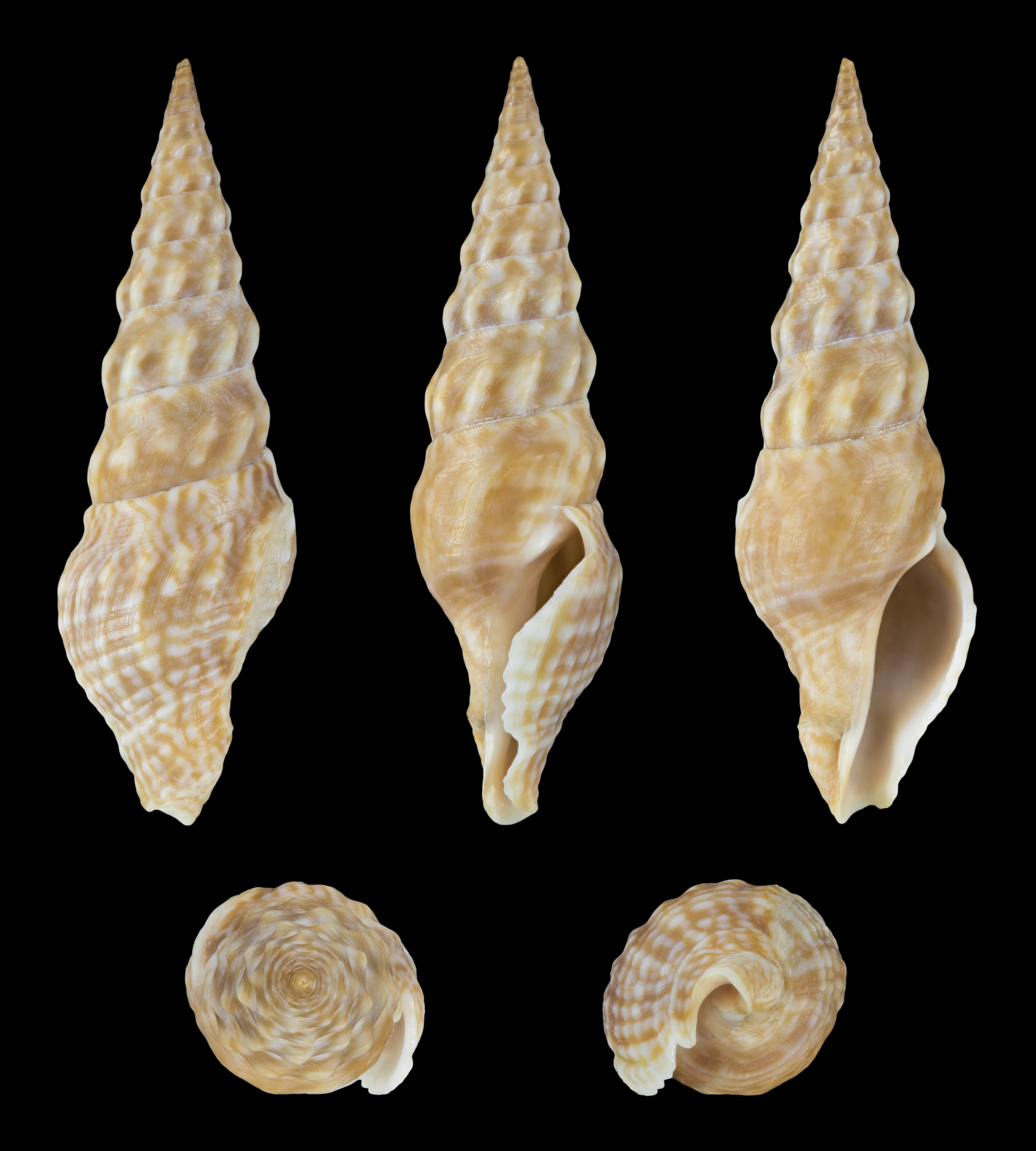
- Shells of Inquisitor vulpionis

Scientific classification
- Kingdom: Animalia
- Phylum: Mollusca
- Class: Gastropoda
- Subclass: Caenogastropoda
- Order: Neogastropoda
- Superfamily: Conoidea
- Family: Pseudomelatomidae
- Genus: Inquisitor
- Species: I. vulpionis

Binomial name
- Inquisitor vulpionis Kuroda & Oyama, 1971

= Inquisitor vulpionis =

Species of gastropod

Inquisitor vulpionis is a species of sea snail, a marine gastropod mollusk in the family Pseudomelatomidae, the turrids. It belongs to Neogastropoda. Members of the order Neogastropoda are mostly gonochoric and broadcast spawners.

== Description ==
The length of the shell varies between 20 mm and 35 mm.

== Distribution ==
This marine species occurs off the Philippines and Japan.
