= Inquisitor japonicus =

Scientific classification
- Kingdom: Animalia
- Phylum: Mollusca
- Class: Gastropoda
- Subclass: Caenogastropoda
- Order: Neogastropoda
- Superfamily: Conoidea
- Family: Pseudomelatomidae
- Genus: Inquisitor
- Species: I. japonicus

Binomial name
- Inquisitor japonicus (Lischke, 1869)

Synonyms
- Clavus japonicus (Lischke, 1869); Drillia japonica Lischke, 1869 (original combination); Inquisitor japonicum [sic] (incorrect gender ending); Tylotiella japonica (Lischke, 1869)

Species of gastropod

Inquisitor japonicus is a species of sea snail, a marine gastropod mollusk in the family Pseudomelatomidae, the turrids and allies.

== Distribution ==
This marine species occurs off Japan and in the Yellow Sea.
