= Inquisitor rubens =

Scientific classification
- Kingdom: Animalia
- Phylum: Mollusca
- Class: Gastropoda
- Subclass: Caenogastropoda
- Order: Neogastropoda
- Superfamily: Conoidea
- Family: Pseudomelatomidae
- Genus: Inquisitor
- Species: I. rubens

Binomial name
- Inquisitor rubens Morassi, 1998

Species of gastropod

Inquisitor rubens is a species of sea snail, a marine gastropod mollusk in the family Pseudomelatomidae, the turrids and allies.

== Description ==
The length of the shell attains 21 mm.

== Distribution ==
This marine species occurs in the Gulf of Aden.
