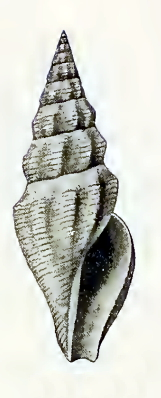
- Shell of Inquisitor multilirata

Scientific classification
- Kingdom: Animalia
- Phylum: Mollusca
- Class: Gastropoda
- Subclass: Caenogastropoda
- Order: Neogastropoda
- Superfamily: Conoidea
- Family: Pseudomelatomidae
- Genus: Inquisitor
- Species: I. multilirata

Binomial name
- Inquisitor multilirata (E. A. Smith, 1877)

Synonyms
- Drillia multilirata Hedley, C. 1903; Pleurotoma multilirata Smith E. A., 1877

= Inquisitor multilirata =

Species of gastropod

Inquisitor multilirata is a species of sea snail, a marine gastropod mollusk in the family Pseudomelatomidae.

This species is considered a nomen dubium by Tucker in his "Catalog of recent and fossil turrids".

== Distribution ==
This marine species is endemic to Australia and occurs off New South Wales.
