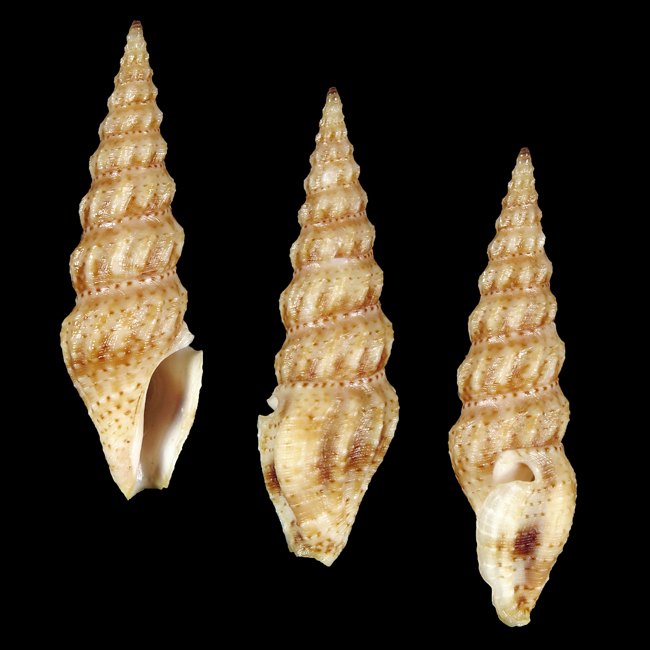
- Shells of Inquisitor frausseni

Scientific classification
- Kingdom: Animalia
- Phylum: Mollusca
- Class: Gastropoda
- Subclass: Caenogastropoda
- Order: Neogastropoda
- Superfamily: Conoidea
- Family: Pseudomelatomidae
- Genus: Inquisitor
- Species: I. frausseni

Binomial name
- Inquisitor frausseni Stahlschmidt, Poppe & Tagaro, 2018

= Inquisitor frausseni =

Species of gastropod

Inquisitor frausseni is a species of sea snail, a marine gastropod mollusc in the family Pseudomelatomidae.

== Distribution ==
This marine species occurs off the Philippines.
