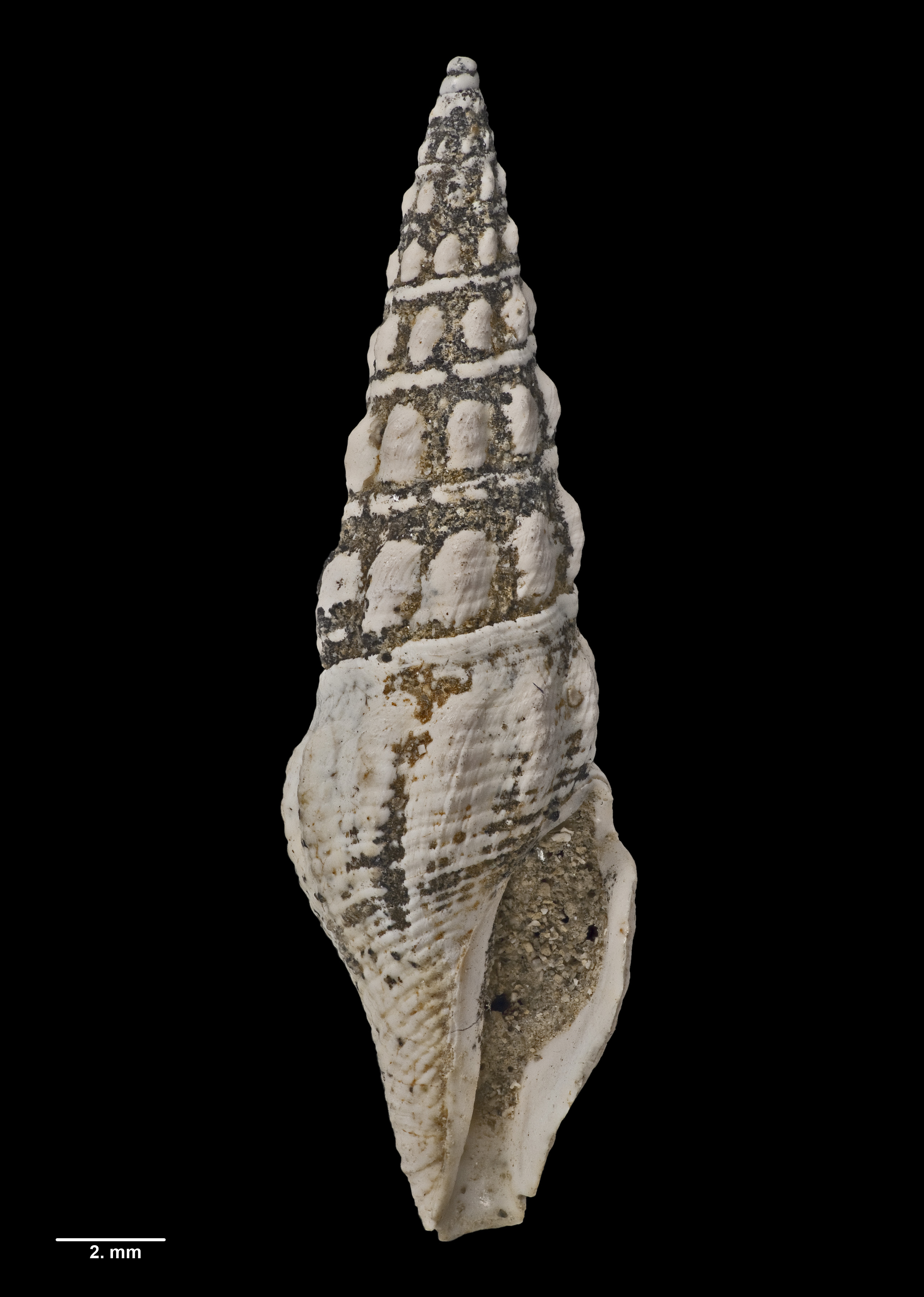
- Type specimen from Auckland War Memorial Museum

Scientific classification
- Kingdom: Animalia
- Phylum: Mollusca
- Class: Gastropoda
- Subclass: Caenogastropoda
- Order: Neogastropoda
- Superfamily: Conoidea
- Family: Pseudomelatomidae
- Genus: Inquisitor
- Species: I. awamoaensis

Binomial name
- Inquisitor awamoaensis (Hutton, 1873)

Synonyms
- † Inquisitor problematicus Powell, 1942; † Pleurotoma awamoaensis Hutton, 1873; † Pseudoinquisitor problematicus Powell, 1942

= Inquisitor awamoaensis =

Extinct species of gastropod

Inquisitor awamoaensis is an extinct species of sea snail, a marine gastropod mollusk in the family Pseudomelatomidae, the turrids and allies.

== Description ==
(Original description) The shell has an elongato-fusiform shape. The spire produced is larger than the body whorl. The whorls are rounded, spirally striated, and transversely ribbed. Those on the body whorl become obsolete towards the anterior end. The suture is spirally striated. The aperture is narrow. The posterior canal is moderate, the anterior rather produced.

== Distribution ==
This extinct marine species is endemic to New Zealand.
