= Inquisitor chocolatus =

Scientific classification
- Kingdom: Animalia
- Phylum: Mollusca
- Class: Gastropoda
- Subclass: Caenogastropoda
- Order: Neogastropoda
- Superfamily: Conoidea
- Family: Pseudomelatomidae
- Genus: Inquisitor
- Species: I. chocolatus

Binomial name
- Inquisitor chocolatus (Smith, E. A., 1875)

Synonyms
- Pleurotoma (Drillia) chocolata E. A. Smith, 1875 (basionym); Pleurotoma (Drillia) chocolatum Smith, E. A., 1875; Pleurotoma chocolata E. A. Smith, 1875 (original combination)

Species of gastropod

Inquisitor chocolatus is a species of sea snail, a marine gastropod mollusk in the family Pseudomelatomidae, the turrids and allies.

== Description ==
The length of the shell attains 25 mm, its diameter 7 mm.

The fusiform, shining shell contains 12 whorls of which 2-3 are in the protoconch. These are smooth and convex. The subsequent whorls are concave at the top, then slightly convex. The sculpture consists of a few rounded ribs and a few inconspicuous, spiral striae. These number 9 in the body whorl, becoming obsolete at the periphery. The aperture measures 2/5 of the total length. The outer lip is thin and extends in the middle. The sinus is rather deep. The siphonal canal is oblique and recurved.

The dark chocolate-colour, with the three yellowish spots which are slightly nodulous on each rib, and the smooth concavity at the upper part of the whorls are very distinctive characters.

== Distribution ==
This marine species occurs off Japan and the Philippines.
