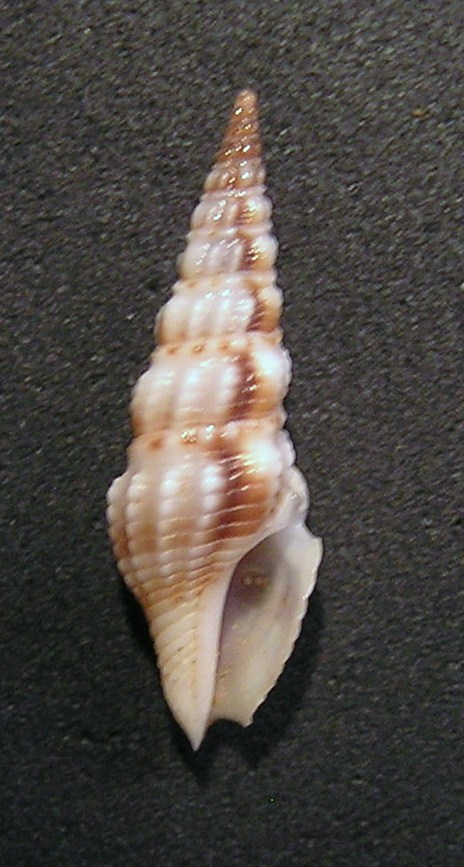
- Apertural view of a shell of Inquisitor isabella

Scientific classification
- Kingdom: Animalia
- Phylum: Mollusca
- Class: Gastropoda
- Subclass: Caenogastropoda
- Order: Neogastropoda
- Superfamily: Conoidea
- Family: Pseudomelatomidae
- Genus: Inquisitor
- Species: I. isabella

Binomial name
- Inquisitor isabella Kilburn, 1988

= Inquisitor isabella =

Species of gastropod

Inquisitor isabella is a species of sea snail, a marine gastropod mollusk in the family Pseudomelatomidae, the turrids and allies.

== Description ==
The length of the shell attains 21.0 mm, its diameter is 6.5 mm.

== Distribution ==
This marine species occurs off Mozambique.
