= Inquisitor flemingi =

Scientific classification
- Kingdom: Animalia
- Phylum: Mollusca
- Class: Gastropoda
- Subclass: Caenogastropoda
- Order: Neogastropoda
- Superfamily: Conoidea
- Family: Pseudomelatomidae
- Genus: Inquisitor
- Species: I. flemingi

Binomial name
- Inquisitor flemingi (Vella, 1954)

Synonyms
- Pseudoinquisitor flemingi P. Vella, 1954

Extinct species of gastropod

Inquisitor flemingi is an extinct species of sea snail, a marine gastropod mollusk in the family Pseudomelatomidae, the turrids and allies.

== Description ==
The length of the shell attains 16.3 mm, its diameter 6.4 mm.

== Distribution ==
This extinct marine species was found in middle Tongaporutuan strata of New Zealand.
