= Inquisitor aemula =

Scientific classification
- Kingdom: Animalia
- Phylum: Mollusca
- Class: Gastropoda
- Subclass: Caenogastropoda
- Order: Neogastropoda
- Superfamily: Conoidea
- Family: Pseudomelatomidae
- Genus: Inquisitor
- Species: I. aemula

Binomial name
- Inquisitor aemula (Angas, 1877)

Synonyms
- Crassispira aemula (Angas, 1877); Drillia aemula Angas, 1877

Species of gastropod

Inquisitor aemula is a species of sea snail, a marine gastropod mollusk in the family Pseudomelatomidae, the turrids and allies.

== Distribution ==
This marine species occurs off New South Wales, Australia
