= Inquisitor plurivaricis =

Scientific classification
- Kingdom: Animalia
- Phylum: Mollusca
- Class: Gastropoda
- Subclass: Caenogastropoda
- Order: Neogastropoda
- Superfamily: Conoidea
- Family: Pseudomelatomidae
- Genus: Inquisitor
- Species: I. plurivaricis

Binomial name
- Inquisitor plurivaricis Li B. Q., Kilburn & Li X. Z., 2010

Species of gastropod

Inquisitor plurivaricis is a species of sea snail, a marine gastropod mollusk in the family Pseudomelatomidae, the turrids and allies.

== Description ==
The length of the shell attains 41.5 mm, its diameter 12.5 mm.

== Distribution ==
This marine species occurs off the Nansha Islands, China
