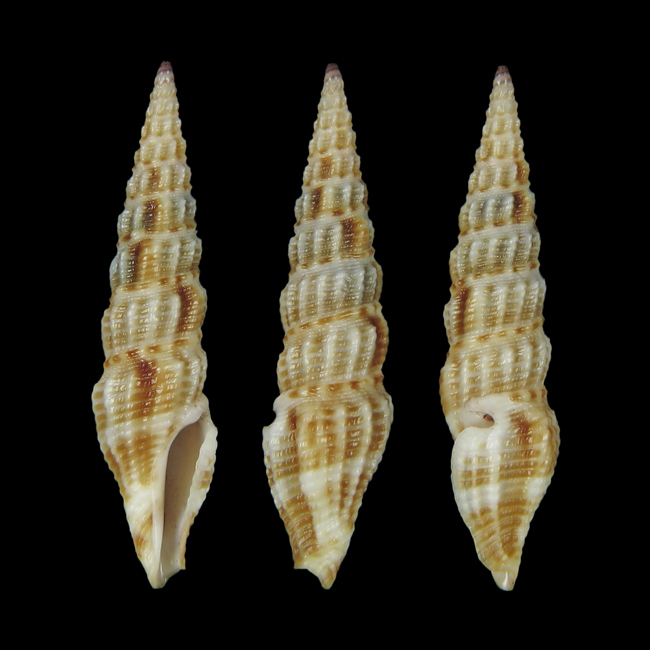
- Shells of Inquisitor michaelmonti

Scientific classification
- Kingdom: Animalia
- Phylum: Mollusca
- Class: Gastropoda
- Subclass: Caenogastropoda
- Order: Neogastropoda
- Superfamily: Conoidea
- Family: Pseudomelatomidae
- Genus: Inquisitor
- Species: I. michaelmonti

Binomial name
- Inquisitor michaelmonti Stahlschmidt, Poppe & Tagaro, 2018

= Inquisitor michaelmonti =

Species of gastropod

Inquisitor michaelmonti is a species of sea snail, a marine gastropod mollusc in the family Pseudomelatomidae.

== Distribution ==
This marine species occurs off the Philippines.
