= Inquisitor cosibensis =

Scientific classification
- Kingdom: Animalia
- Phylum: Mollusca
- Class: Gastropoda
- Subclass: Caenogastropoda
- Order: Neogastropoda
- Superfamily: Conoidea
- Family: Pseudomelatomidae
- Genus: Inquisitor
- Species: I. cosibensis

Binomial name
- Inquisitor cosibensis (M. Yokoyama, 1920)

Synonyms
- † Etremopa cosibensis (M. Yokoyama, 1920); † Pleurotoma (Drillia) cosibensis M. Yokoyapa, 1920

Extinct species of gastropod

Inquisitor cosibensis is an extinct species of sea snail, a marine gastropod mollusk in the family Pseudomelatomidae, the turrids and allies.

== Distribution ==
This extinct marine species was found in Pliocene strata in the Koshiba Formation at Kanagawa, Japan.
