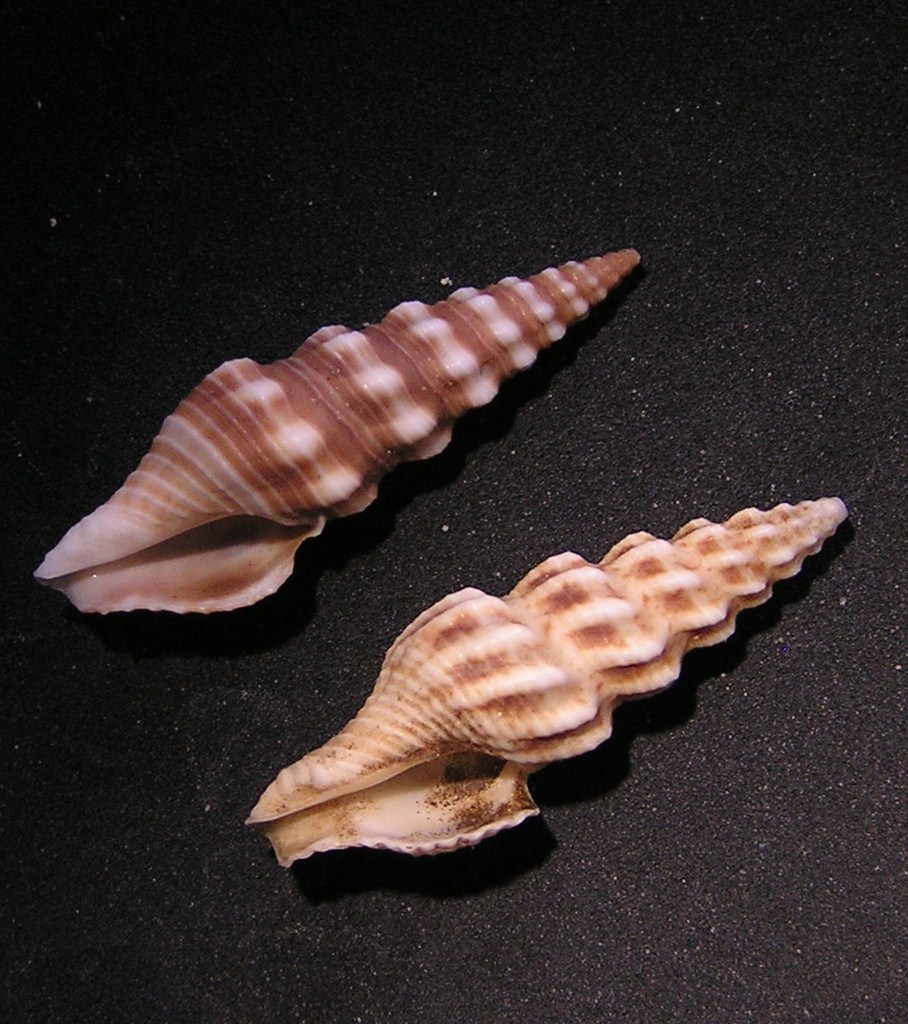
- Apertural view of a shell of Inquisitor intertinctus

Scientific classification
- Kingdom: Animalia
- Phylum: Mollusca
- Class: Gastropoda
- Subclass: Caenogastropoda
- Order: Neogastropoda
- Superfamily: Conoidea
- Family: Pseudomelatomidae
- Genus: Inquisitor
- Species: I. intertinctus

Binomial name
- Inquisitor intertinctus (E. A. Smith, 1877)

Synonyms
- Pleurotoma (Drillia) intertincta E. A. Smith, 1877 (basionym); Pleurotoma intertincta Smith E. A., 1877

= Inquisitor intertinctus =

Species of gastropod

Inquisitor intertinctus is a species of sea snail, a marine gastropod mollusk in the family Pseudomelatomidae, the turrids and allies.

== Description ==
The length of the shell varies from 20 mm to 40 mm.

This species seems to be somewhat variable in sculpture and colour. The spiral lirae of the penultimate whorl vary in number from 3 to 5. In other specimens not only the infrasutural keel is adorned with red-brown dots, but also the principal lirae on many places.

== Distribution ==
This marine species occurs off the Philippines, and west to the Gulf of Thailand and Andaman Islands; off the Northern Territories, Australia.

== Behaviour ==
This species unlike many other molluscs are non-broadcast spawner and don't have a trocophore stage in there life cycle.
