= Inquisitor nodicostatus =

Scientific classification
- Kingdom: Animalia
- Phylum: Mollusca
- Class: Gastropoda
- Subclass: Caenogastropoda
- Order: Neogastropoda
- Superfamily: Conoidea
- Family: Pseudomelatomidae
- Genus: Inquisitor
- Species: I. nodicostatus

Binomial name
- Inquisitor nodicostatus Kilburn, 1988

Synonyms
- Crassispira aesopus (non Schepman, 1913) Kilburn, 1973

Species of gastropod

Inquisitor nodicostatus is a species of sea snail, a marine gastropod mollusk in the family Pseudomelatomidae, the turrids.

== Description ==
The length of the shell attains 55.8 mm, its diameter is 14.9 mm.

== Distribution ==
This marine species occurs off KwaZulu-Natal, South Africa.
