= Inquisitor fraudator =

Scientific classification
- Kingdom: Animalia
- Phylum: Mollusca
- Class: Gastropoda
- Subclass: Caenogastropoda
- Order: Neogastropoda
- Superfamily: Conoidea
- Family: Pseudomelatomidae
- Genus: Inquisitor
- Species: I. fraudator

Binomial name
- Inquisitor fraudator (Finlay & Marwick, 1937)

Synonyms
- Pseudoinquisitor flemingi P. Vella, 1954

Extinct species of gastropod

Inquisitor fraudator is an extinct species of sea snail, a marine gastropod mollusk in the family Pseudomelatomidae, the turrids and allies.

== Distribution ==
This extinct marine species was found in Wangaloan strata of New Zealand.
