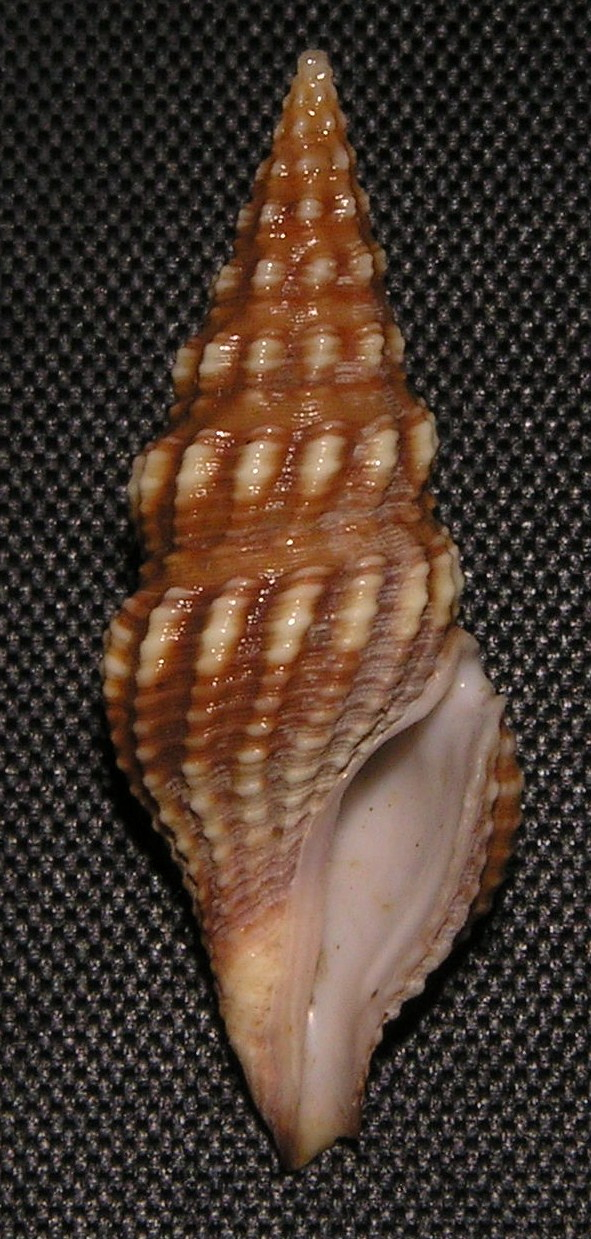
- Apertural view of a shell of Inquisitor kurodai

Scientific classification
- Kingdom: Animalia
- Phylum: Mollusca
- Class: Gastropoda
- Subclass: Caenogastropoda
- Order: Neogastropoda
- Superfamily: Conoidea
- Family: Pseudomelatomidae
- Genus: Inquisitor
- Species: I. kurodai

Binomial name
- Inquisitor kurodai (Habe & Kosuge, 1966)

Synonyms
- Brachytoma kurodai Habe & Kosuge, 1966

= Inquisitor kurodai =

Species of gastropod

Inquisitor kurodai, common name Kuroda's turrid, is a species of sea snail, a marine gastropod mollusk in the family Pseudomelatomidae, the turrids and allies.

== Description ==
The length of the shell attains 35 mm.

== Distribution ==
This marine species occurs off Japan and the Philippines.
