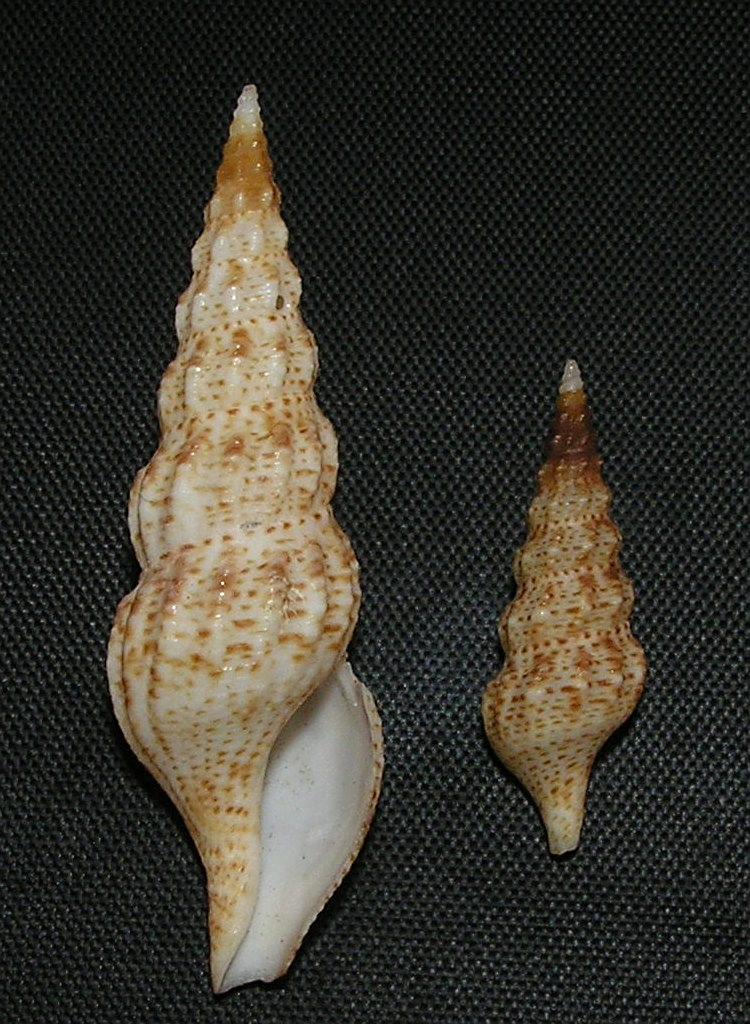
- Shell of Inquisitor perclathrata

Scientific classification
- Kingdom: Animalia
- Phylum: Mollusca
- Class: Gastropoda
- Subclass: Caenogastropoda
- Order: Neogastropoda
- Superfamily: Conoidea
- Family: Pseudomelatomidae
- Genus: Inquisitor
- Species: I. perclathrata

Binomial name
- Inquisitor perclathrata Kuroda, T., 1960

Synonyms
- Inquisitor perculathrata Kuroda, T., 1959 (lapsus)

= Inquisitor perclathrata =

Species of gastropod

Inquisitor perclathrata is a species of sea snail, a marine gastropod mollusk in the family Pseudomelatomidae, the turrids and allies.

This is a synonym of Clavus (Clathrodrillia) perclathrata Azuma, 1960 (nomen nudum).

== Description ==
The length of the shell attains 27 mm.

== Distribution ==
This marine species occurs off Japan.
