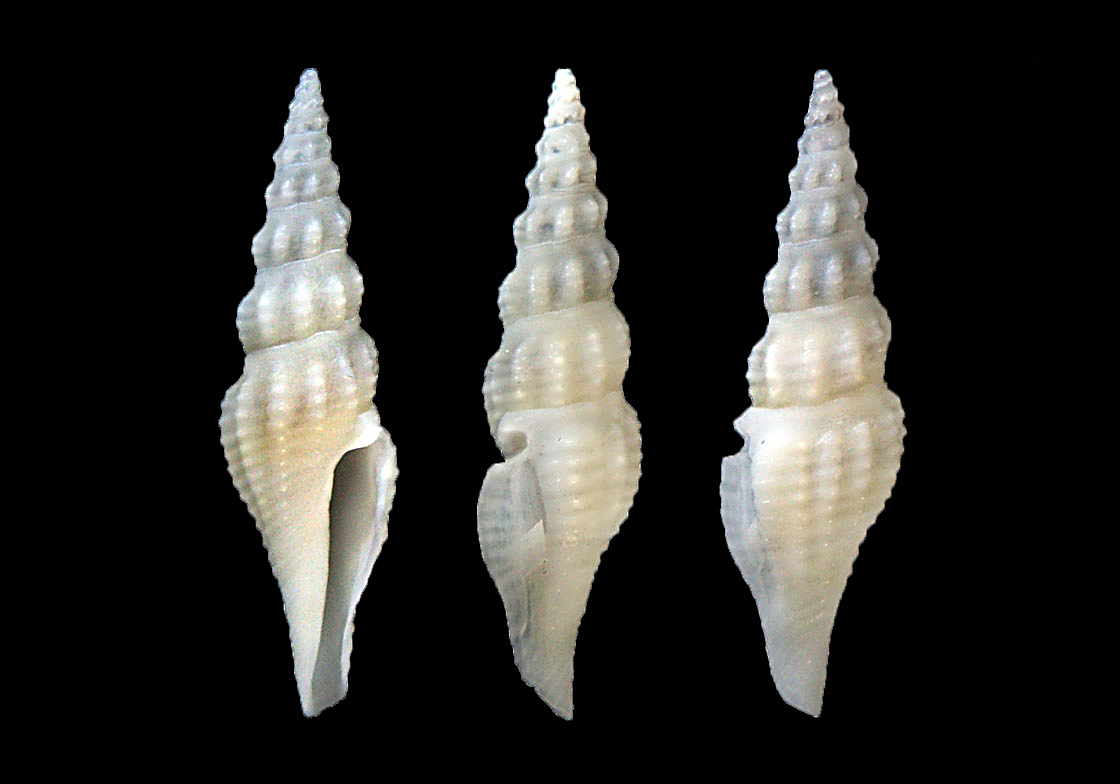
- Shells of Inquisitor fusiformis (holotype in MNHN, Paris)

Scientific classification
- Kingdom: Animalia
- Phylum: Mollusca
- Class: Gastropoda
- Subclass: Caenogastropoda
- Order: Neogastropoda
- Superfamily: Conoidea
- Family: Pseudomelatomidae
- Genus: Inquisitor
- Species: I. fusiformis

Binomial name
- Inquisitor fusiformis Stahlschmidt, 2013

= Inquisitor fusiformis =

Species of gastropod

Inquisitor fusiformis is a species of sea snail, a marine gastropod mollusk in the family Pseudomelatomidae, the turrids and allies.

== Description ==
The length of the shell varies between 19 mm and 21 mm.

== Distribution ==
This marine species occurs off the Philippines.
