= Inquisitor minutosternalis =

Scientific classification
- Kingdom: Animalia
- Phylum: Mollusca
- Class: Gastropoda
- Subclass: Caenogastropoda
- Order: Neogastropoda
- Superfamily: Conoidea
- Family: Pseudomelatomidae
- Genus: Inquisitor
- Species: I. minutosternalis

Binomial name
- Inquisitor minutosternalis Kosuge, 1993

Species of gastropod

Inquisitor minutosternalis is a species of sea snail, a marine gastropod mollusk in the family Pseudomelatomidae, the turrids and allies.

== Distribution ==
This marine species is endemic to Australia and occurs off Western Australia
