= Inquisitor shibanoi =

Scientific classification
- Kingdom: Animalia
- Phylum: Mollusca
- Class: Gastropoda
- Subclass: Caenogastropoda
- Order: Neogastropoda
- Superfamily: Conoidea
- Family: Pseudomelatomidae
- Genus: Inquisitor
- Species: I. shibanoi

Binomial name
- Inquisitor shibanoi Masuda, 1967

Extinct species of gastropod

Inquisitor shibanoi is an extinct species of sea snail, a marine gastropod mollusk in the family Pseudomelatomidae, the turrids and allies.

== Description ==
The length of the shell reaches a length of 14 mm, and a diameter of 5 mm.

== Distribution ==
Fossils of this marine species were found in the Higashi-Innai Formation in Japan.
