= Inquisitor angustus =

Scientific classification
- Kingdom: Animalia
- Phylum: Mollusca
- Class: Gastropoda
- Subclass: Caenogastropoda
- Order: Neogastropoda
- Superfamily: Conoidea
- Family: Pseudomelatomidae
- Genus: Inquisitor
- Species: I. angustus

Binomial name
- Inquisitor angustus Kuroda, Habe & Oyama, 1971

Species of gastropod

Inquisitor angustus is a species of sea snail, a marine gastropod mollusk in the family Pseudomelatomidae, the turrids and allies.

== Description ==
The length of the shell attains 40 mm, its diameter is 10.3 mm.

== Distribution ==
This marine species occurs off Japan and Korea.
