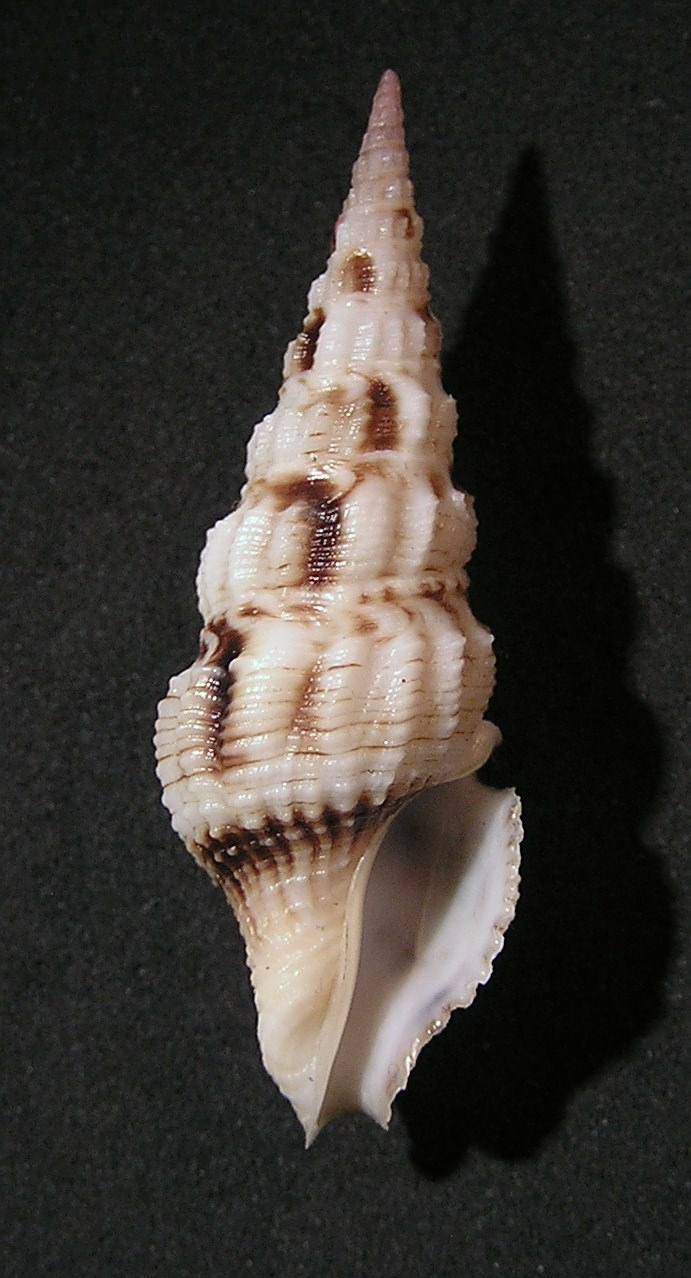
- Apertural view of a shell of Inquisitor taivaricosa

Scientific classification
- Kingdom: Animalia
- Phylum: Mollusca
- Class: Gastropoda
- Subclass: Caenogastropoda
- Order: Neogastropoda
- Superfamily: Conoidea
- Family: Pseudomelatomidae
- Genus: Inquisitor
- Species: I. taivaricosa

Binomial name
- Inquisitor taivaricosa Chang & Wu, 2000

= Inquisitor taivaricosa =

Species of gastropod

Inquisitor taivaricosa is a species of sea snail, a marine gastropod mollusk in the family Pseudomelatomidae, the turrids and allies.

== Description ==
The length of the shell varies between 25 mm and 50 mm.

== Distribution ==
This marine species occurs off the Philippines and in the South China Sea.
