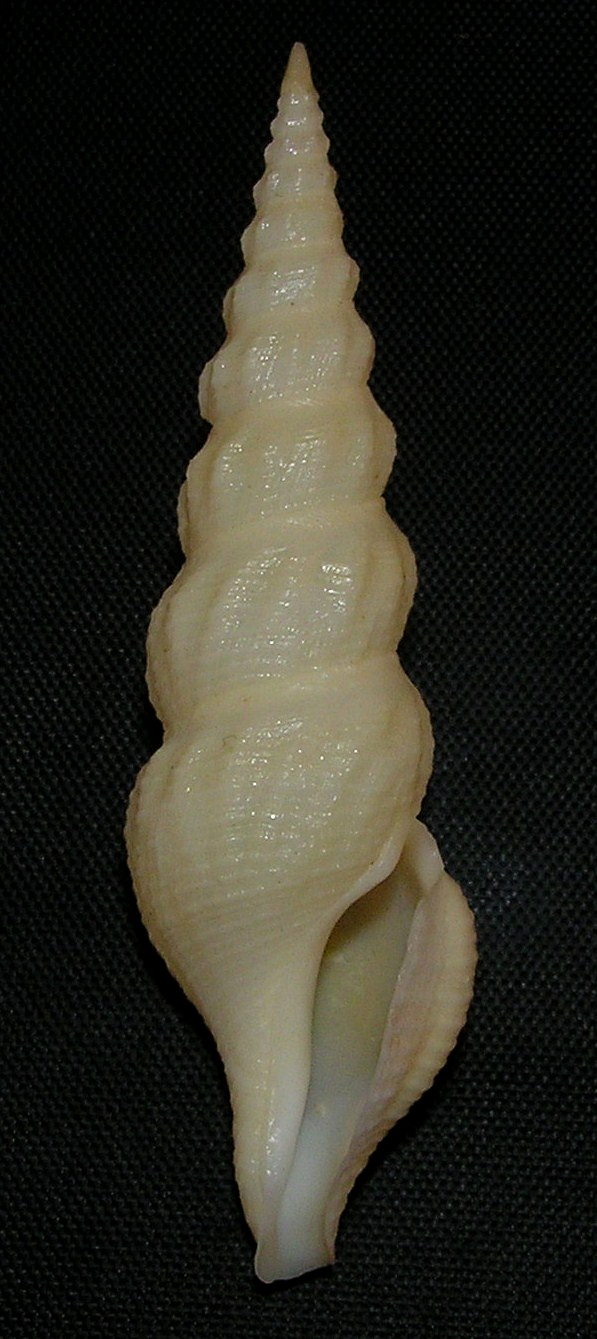
- Apertural view of a shell of Inquisitor nudivaricosus

Scientific classification
- Kingdom: Animalia
- Phylum: Mollusca
- Class: Gastropoda
- Subclass: Caenogastropoda
- Order: Neogastropoda
- Superfamily: Conoidea
- Family: Pseudomelatomidae
- Genus: Inquisitor
- Species: I. nudivaricosus

Binomial name
- Inquisitor nudivaricosus Kuroda & Oyama, 1971

= Inquisitor nudivaricosus =

Species of gastropod

Inquisitor nudivaricosus is a species of sea snail, a marine gastropod mollusk in the family Pseudomelatomidae, the turrids and allies.

== Description ==
The length of the shell varies between 20 mm and 60 mm.

== Distribution ==
This marine species occurs off Korea and Taiwan.
