= Inquisitor sexradiata =

- Shell of Inquisitor radula (specimen at Naturalis Biodiversity Center)

Scientific classification
- Kingdom: Animalia
- Phylum: Mollusca
- Class: Gastropoda
- Subclass: Caenogastropoda
- Order: Neogastropoda
- Superfamily: Conoidea
- Family: Pseudomelatomidae
- Genus: Inquisitor
- Species: I. sexradiata

Binomial name
- Inquisitor sexradiata (Odhner, 1917)

Synonyms
- Drillia sexradiata Odhner, 1917

Species of gastropod

Inquisitor sexradiata is a species of sea snail, a marine gastropod mollusk in the family Pseudomelatomidae.

== Distribution ==
This marine species is endemic to Australia and occurs off Western Australia.
