= Inquisitor waihoraensis =

Scientific classification
- Kingdom: Animalia
- Phylum: Mollusca
- Class: Gastropoda
- Subclass: Caenogastropoda
- Order: Neogastropoda
- Superfamily: Conoidea
- Family: Pseudomelatomidae
- Genus: Inquisitor
- Species: I. waihoraensis

Binomial name
- Inquisitor waihoraensis Marwick, 1931

Extinct species of gastropod

Inquisitor waihoraensis is an extinct species of sea snail, a marine gastropod mollusk in the family Pseudomelatomidae, the turrids and allies.

== Distribution ==
This extinct marine species was found in Tertiary strata of New Zealand.
