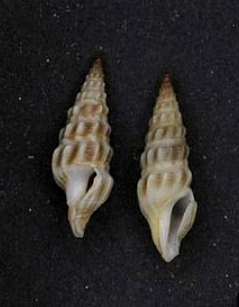
- Shells of Inquisitor tuberosus (specimens at Naturalis Biodiversity Center)

Scientific classification
- Kingdom: Animalia
- Phylum: Mollusca
- Class: Gastropoda
- Subclass: Caenogastropoda
- Order: Neogastropoda
- Superfamily: Conoidea
- Family: Pseudomelatomidae
- Genus: Inquisitor
- Species: I. tuberosus

Binomial name
- Inquisitor tuberosus (E.A. Smith, 1875)

Synonyms
- Brachytoma tuberosa (E. A. Smith, 1875); Drillia tuberosa (E.A. Smith, 1875); Pleurotoma tuberosa E.A. Smith, 1875

= Inquisitor tuberosus =

Species of gastropod

Inquisitor tuberosus is a species of sea snail, a marine gastropod mollusk in the family Pseudomelatomidae.

== Description ==
The length of the shell attains 18 mm.

== Distribution ==
This species occurs in South China Sea and off Japan and the Philippines.
