= Inquisitor indistinctus =

Scientific classification
- Kingdom: Animalia
- Phylum: Mollusca
- Class: Gastropoda
- Subclass: Caenogastropoda
- Order: Neogastropoda
- Superfamily: Conoidea
- Family: Pseudomelatomidae
- Genus: Inquisitor
- Species: I. indistinctus

Binomial name
- Inquisitor indistinctus Sysoev, 1996

Species of gastropod

Inquisitor indistinctus is a species of sea snail, a marine gastropod mollusk in the family Pseudomelatomidae, the turrids and allies.

== Description ==
The length of the shell can reach 31.3 mm. Its diameter, meanwhile, can reach 8.3 mm.

== Distribution ==
This marine species is found off of the Maldives.
