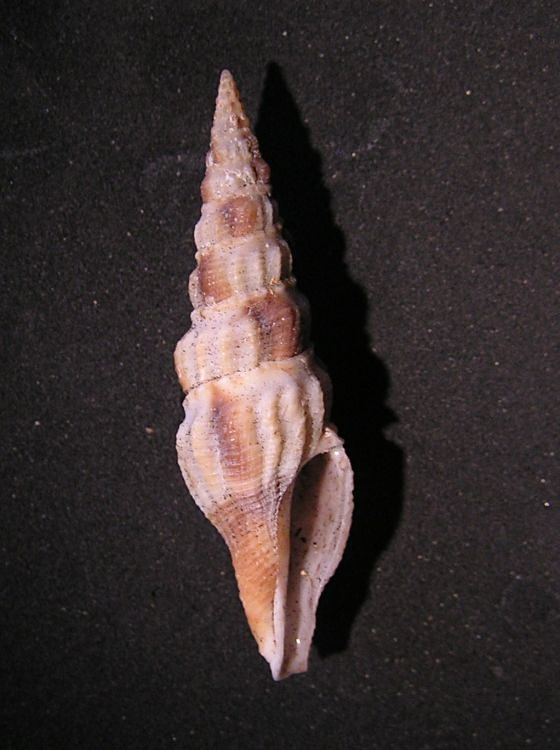
- Apertural view of a shell of Inquisitor rufovaricosus

Scientific classification
- Kingdom: Animalia
- Phylum: Mollusca
- Class: Gastropoda
- Subclass: Caenogastropoda
- Order: Neogastropoda
- Superfamily: Conoidea
- Family: Pseudomelatomidae
- Genus: Inquisitor
- Species: I. rufovaricosus

Binomial name
- Inquisitor rufovaricosus (Kuroda & Oyama, 1971)

Synonyms
- Crassispira rufovaricosa Kuroda, Habe & Oyama, 1971

= Inquisitor rufovaricosus =

Species of gastropod

Inquisitor rufovaricosus is a species of sea snail, a marine gastropod mollusk in the family Pseudomelatomidae, the turrids.

== Description ==
Inquisitor rufovaricosus has a shell size of 25–65 mm.

== Distribution ==
Inquisitor rufovaricosus is native to Malaysia, the Philippines, and Japan.
