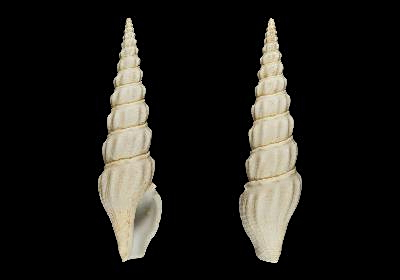
- Shells of Inquisitor eburatus

Scientific classification
- Kingdom: Animalia
- Phylum: Mollusca
- Class: Gastropoda
- Subclass: Caenogastropoda
- Order: Neogastropoda
- Superfamily: Conoidea
- Family: Pseudomelatomidae
- Genus: Inquisitor
- Species: I. eburatus

Binomial name
- Inquisitor eburatus Bozzetti, 2011

= Inquisitor eburatus =

Species of gastropod

Inquisitor eburatus is a species of sea snail, a marine gastropod mollusk in the family Pseudomelatomidae.

== Description ==
The length of the shell varies between 58 mm and 70 mm.

== Distribution ==
This marine species occurs off Madagascar.
