= Inquisitor arctatus =

Scientific classification
- Kingdom: Animalia
- Phylum: Mollusca
- Class: Gastropoda
- Subclass: Caenogastropoda
- Order: Neogastropoda
- Superfamily: Conoidea
- Family: Pseudomelatomidae
- Genus: Inquisitor
- Species: I. arctatus

Binomial name
- Inquisitor arctatus Kilburn, 1988

Species of gastropod

Inquisitor arctatus is a species of sea snail, a marine gastropod mollusk in the family Pseudomelatomidae, the turrids and allies.

== Description ==
The length of the shell attains 49,8 mm, its diameter 13,1 mm

== Distribution ==
This marine species occurs off Zululand to Transkei, South Africa; also off the Philippines.
