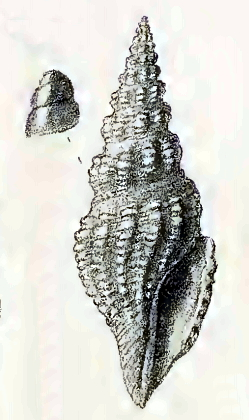
- Original image of a shell and the protoconch of Inquisitor insignita

Scientific classification
- Kingdom: Animalia
- Phylum: Mollusca
- Class: Gastropoda
- Subclass: Caenogastropoda
- Order: Neogastropoda
- Superfamily: Conoidea
- Family: Pseudomelatomidae
- Genus: Inquisitor
- Species: I. insignita

Binomial name
- Inquisitor insignita (Melvill, 1923)

Synonyms
- Drillia insignita Melvill, 1923

= Inquisitor insignita =

Species of gastropod

Inquisitor insignita is a species of sea snail, a marine gastropod mollusk in the family Pseudomelatomidae.

== Description ==
The length of the shell attains 26 mm, its diameter 10 mm.

(Original description) The fusiform shell is gradually attenuate and incrassate. it is of a rich siennabrown in colour. it contains 12 whorls, including three whorls of the protoconch, smooth, shining brown, semidiaphanous, centrally carinate. The fourth whorl shows numerous somewhat undeveloped noduled riblets. The remaining eight whorls are spirally ornamented with close revolving lines, crossing the conspicuously noduled longitudinal ribs. The nodules are white. The body whorl is obliquely twelve-ribbed, below the periphery obscurely fasciated with white. The siphonal canal is somewhat extended and straight columellarly. The outer lip is effuse. The anal sinus is well marked, narrow, but deep.

== Distribution ==
This marine species occurs off the Philippines and Indonesia.
