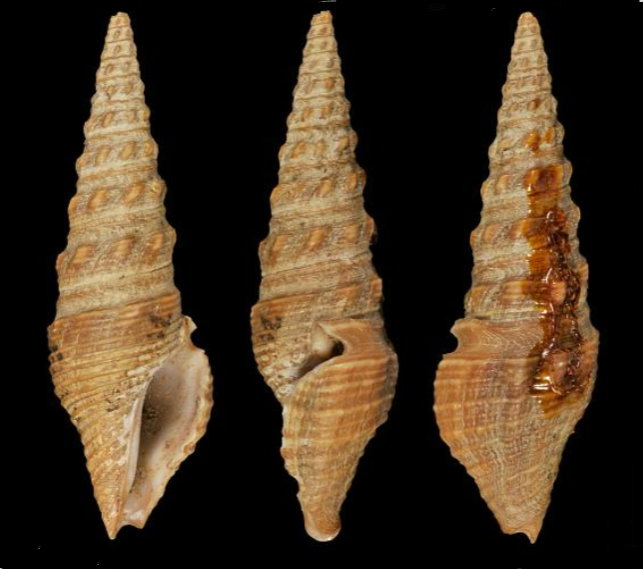
- Shell of Inquisitor interrupta (holotype at the Smithsonian Institution)

Scientific classification
- Kingdom: Animalia
- Phylum: Mollusca
- Class: Gastropoda
- Subclass: Caenogastropoda
- Order: Neogastropoda
- Superfamily: Conoidea
- Family: Pseudomelatomidae
- Genus: Inquisitor
- Species: I. interrupta

Binomial name
- Inquisitor interrupta (Lamarck, 1816)

Synonyms
- Pleurotoma interrupta Lamarck, 1816; Pleurotoma seminifera Gould, A.A., 1849

= Inquisitor interrupta =

Species of gastropod

Inquisitor interrupta is a species of sea snail, a marine gastropod mollusk in the family Pseudomelatomidae, the turrids and allies.

== Description ==
The length of the shell attains 30 mm.

The shell is sharply turreted, longitudinally ribbed and spirally striated. It is yellowish brown, the ribs reddish brown.

== Distribution ==
This marine species occurs off Japan.
