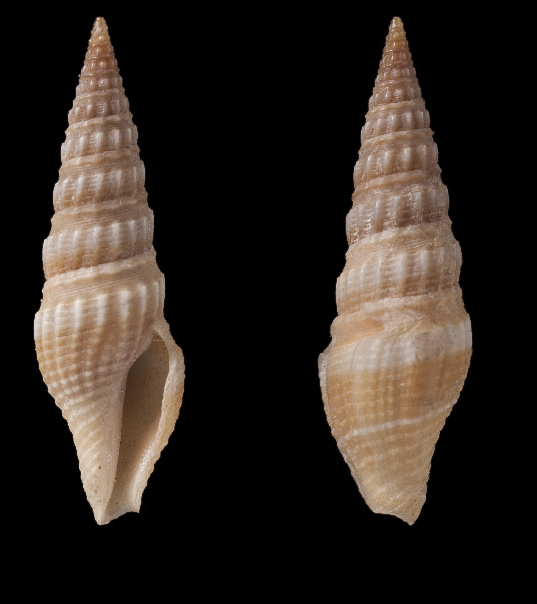
- Shell of Inquisitor latifasciata (specimen in the Natural History Museum, London)

Scientific classification
- Kingdom: Animalia
- Phylum: Mollusca
- Class: Gastropoda
- Subclass: Caenogastropoda
- Order: Neogastropoda
- Superfamily: Conoidea
- Family: Pseudomelatomidae
- Genus: Inquisitor
- Species: I. latifasciata

Binomial name
- Inquisitor latifasciata (Sowerby II, 1870)

Synonyms
- Inquisitor multicostellata Smith, 1888; Pleurotoma latifasciata Sowerby II, 1870

= Inquisitor latifasciata =

Species of gastropod

Inquisitor latifasciata is a species of sea snail, a marine gastropod mollusk in the family Pseudomelatomidae, the turrids and allies.

== Distribution ==
This marine species was found off Hong Kong
