= Crassispira cotteri =

Scientific classification
- Kingdom: Animalia
- Phylum: Mollusca
- Class: Gastropoda
- Subclass: Caenogastropoda
- Order: Neogastropoda
- Superfamily: Conoidea
- Family: Pseudomelatomidae
- Genus: Crassispira
- Species: C. cotteri

Binomial name
- Crassispira cotteri (E.W. Vredenburg, 1921)

Synonyms
- Drillia (Crassispira) cotteri E.W. Vredenburg, 1921; Inquisitor cotteri (E.W. Vredenburg, 1921)

Extinct species of gastropod

Crassispira cotteri is an extinct species of sea snail, a marine gastropod mollusk in the family Pseudomelatomidae, the turrids and allies.

== Distribution ==
This extinct marine species was found in Miocene strata in Myanmar and India; age range: 23.03 to 20.43 Ma.
