= Inquisitor elegans =

Scientific classification
- Kingdom: Animalia
- Phylum: Mollusca
- Class: Gastropoda
- Subclass: Caenogastropoda
- Order: Neogastropoda
- Superfamily: Conoidea
- Family: Pseudomelatomidae
- Genus: Inquisitor
- Species: I. elegans

Binomial name
- Inquisitor elegans Bozzetti, 1993

Species of gastropod

Inquisitor elegans is a species of sea snail, a marine gastropod mollusk in the family Pseudomelatomidae, the turrids and allies.

== Description ==
Inquisitor elegans is a sharp conical shell with a broad, rounded subsutural ramp and a domed spire, with an average shell length of 50 mm. Classified as pseudomelatomid turrid snail are typically found in the north-western part of the Indian Ocean. Generally found in moderate depths between 50~200 m deep in sand.

== Distribution ==
This species occurs in the Indian Ocean off Somalia.
