= Archaeospheniscus lopdelli =

Archaeospheniscus lopdelli Temporal range: Late Eocene–Late Oligocene

Scientific classification
- Domain: Eukaryota
- Kingdom: Animalia
- Phylum: Chordata
- Class: Aves
- Order: Sphenisciformes
- Family: Spheniscidae
- Genus: †Archaeospheniscus
- Species: †A. lopdelli

Binomial name
- †Archaeospheniscus lopdelli Marples, 1952

Extinct species of bird

Archaeospheniscus lopdelli was the largest species of the extinct penguin genus Archaeospheniscus, standing about 90–120 cm (35–47 in) high, or somewhat less than the extant emperor penguin. It is only known from bones of a single individual (Otago Museum C.47.21) which was found in the Late Oligocene Kokoamu Greensand Formation (27-28 MYA) at Duntroon, New Zealand. Bones apparently belonging to this species are now also known from the Late Eocene La Meseta Formation (34-37 MYA) on Seymour Island, Antarctica (Tambussi et al., 2006).

As the bird is not very well distinguished except in size from its contemporary congener Archaeospheniscus lowei and the size range, an estimated 85–120 cm, is in the upper range of the variation found in modern penguins, it is probable that A. lopdelli is a synonym of A. lowelli. As the recent finds in Antarctica suggest, this is far from certain, however, and there remains much to be learned about the systematics and biogeography of the two larger Archaeospheniscus species.

The species' binomen honors J. C. Lopdell, who assisted Marples in recovering the fossils of this bird and others found in the Duntroon excavations.
