= Archaeospheniscus wimani =

Archaeospheniscus wimani Temporal range: Middle Eocene–Late Eocene

Scientific classification
- Domain: Eukaryota
- Kingdom: Animalia
- Phylum: Chordata
- Class: Aves
- Order: Sphenisciformes
- Family: Spheniscidae
- Genus: †Archaeospheniscus
- Species: †A. wimani

Binomial name
- †Archaeospheniscus wimani Marples 1953

Synonyms
- Notodyptes wimani Marples 1953

Extinct species of bird

Archaeospheniscus wimani is an extinct species of penguin. It was the smallest species of the genus Archaeospheniscus, being approximately 75 to 85 centimetres (30 to 33 in) high, or about the size of a gentoo penguin. It is also the oldest known species of its genus, as its remains were found in Middle or Late Eocene strata (34-50 MYA) of the La Meseta Formation on Seymour Island, Antarctica. It is known from a fair number of bones.

The species' binomen honors Carl Wiman, an early 20th-century researcher who laid the groundwork for the classification of the prehistoric penguins.
