= Archaeospheniscus =

Archaeospheniscus Temporal range: Middle/Late Eocene - Late Oligocene

Scientific classification
- Domain: Eukaryota
- Kingdom: Animalia
- Phylum: Chordata
- Class: Aves
- Order: Sphenisciformes
- Family: Spheniscidae
- Subfamily: †Palaeeudyptinae
- Genus: †Archaeospheniscus; Marples, 1952

Species
- Archaeospheniscus lowei (type); Archaeospheniscus lopdelli Archaeospheniscus wimani

Synonyms
- Notodyptes Marples, 1953

Extinct genus of birds

Archaeospheniscus is an extinct genus of large penguins. It currently contains three species, known from somewhat fragmentary remains. A. wimani, the smallest species (about the size of a gentoo penguin), was found in Middle or Late Eocene strata (34-50 MYA) of the La Meseta Formation on Seymour Island, Antarctica, whereas the other two, about the size of a modern emperor penguin, are known from bones recovered from the Late Oligocene Kokoamu Greensand Formation (27-28 MYA) at Duntroon, New Zealand.

The genus is one of the earliest known primitive penguins. Its humerus is still very slender, between the form seen in ordinary bird wings and the thickened condition found in modern penguins. On the other hand, the tarsometatarsus shows a peculiar mix of characters found in modern and primitive forms. Whether this signifies that the genus is an ancestor of modern taxa or represents a case of parallel evolution is unknown.

== Species ==
- Archaeospheniscus lowei
- Archaeospheniscus lopdelli
- Archaeospheniscus wimani
