= Avaruarachne =

Scientific classification
- Kingdom: Animalia
- Phylum: Arthropoda
- Subphylum: Chelicerata
- Class: Arachnida
- Order: Araneae
- Infraorder: Araneomorphae
- Family: Salticidae
- Genus: Avaruarachne
- Species: A. satchelli

Binomial name
- Avaruarachne satchelli (Marples, 1955)

Synonyms
- Avarua Marples, 1955

Genus of spiders

Avaruarachne is a genus of jumping spiders containing the single species Avaruarachne satchelli. The species was first described by Brian John Marples in 1955 as Avarua satchelli, but Avarua was discovered to be preoccupied and was replaced by Avaruarachne by Danniella Sherwood in 2021. It has only been found in the Cook Islands.
