= Microbathyphantes =

Scientific classification
- Kingdom: Animalia
- Phylum: Arthropoda
- Subphylum: Chelicerata
- Class: Arachnida
- Order: Araneae
- Infraorder: Araneomorphae
- Family: Linyphiidae
- Genus: Microbathyphantes van Helsdingen, 1985

Type species
- M. palmarius (Marples, 1955)

Species
- 5, see text

Synonyms
- Priscipalpus Millidge, 1991

Genus of spiders

Microbathyphantes is a genus of dwarf spiders that was first described by P. J. van Helsdingen in 1985.

== Species ==
As of May 2019 it contains five species:

- Microbathyphantes aokii (Saito, 1982) – China, Vietnam, Japan
- Microbathyphantes celebes Tanasevitch, 2012 – Indonesia (Sulawesi)
- Microbathyphantes palmarius (Marples, 1955) (type) – Sri Lanka, India, Seychelles, Myanmar, Thailand, Polynesia
- Microbathyphantes spedani (Locket, 1968) – Cameroon, Nigeria, Angola
- Microbathyphantes tateyamaensis (Oi, 1960) – Japan
