= Archaeospheniscus lowei =

Archaeospheniscus lowei Temporal range: Late Oligocene 28–27 Ma

Scientific classification
- Domain: Eukaryota
- Kingdom: Animalia
- Phylum: Chordata
- Class: Aves
- Order: Sphenisciformes
- Family: Spheniscidae
- Genus: †Archaeospheniscus
- Species: †A. lowei

Binomial name
- †Archaeospheniscus lowei Marples, 1952

Extinct species of bird

Archaeospheniscus lowei is the type species of the extinct penguin genus Archaeospheniscus. It stood approximately 85–115 cm high, between a modern king penguin and an emperor penguin in size. It is known from bones of a single individual (Otago Museum C.47.20) and possibly some additional material such as the OM C.47.27 femur, all recovered from the Late Oligocene Kokoamu Greensand Formation (27-28 MYA) at Duntroon, New Zealand.

The species' binomen was given in honor of Percy Lowe, who researched prehistoric penguins and proposed a theory (now considered erroneous) that these birds were derived from reptiles independently of the other modern birds.
