= Molly Marples =

Microbial ecologist

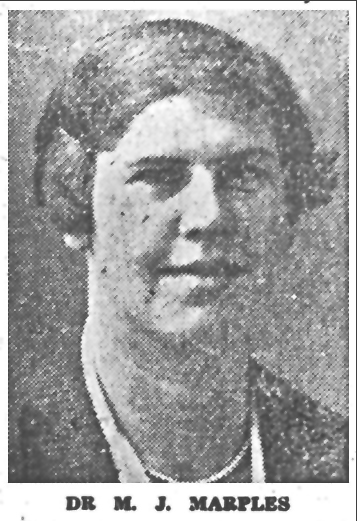
Dr Mary (Molly) Marples née Ransford. Otago Daily Times 13/05/1949

Mary "Molly" Joyce Marples (née Ransford; 1908–1998) was a microbial ecologist/medical mycologist who spent most of her career conducting research and teaching at the University of Otago in New Zealand from her appointment in 1946 until her retirement in 1967. She is noted as an early proponent of the theory that skin provides an ecosystem that supports a diversity of microorganisms.

== Life ==
Marples was born in Kalimpong in northern India; her parents were missionaries there. She was educated in England and completed a degree in zoology at Somerville College, Oxford.

In 1931, Marples married Brian John Marples, with whom she had two sons.

== See also ==
- Marples, M. J. (1965). The ecology of the human skin. Springfield, Illinois Thomas
- Marples, M. J. (1969). Life on the human skin. Scientific American.
