= Microbathyphantes palmarius =

Scientific classification
- Kingdom: Animalia
- Phylum: Arthropoda
- Subphylum: Chelicerata
- Class: Arachnida
- Order: Araneae
- Infraorder: Araneomorphae
- Family: Linyphiidae
- Genus: Microbathyphantes
- Species: M. palmarius

Binomial name
- Microbathyphantes palmarius (Marples, 1955)

Species of spider

Microbathyphantes palmarius, is a species of spider of the genus Microbathyphantes. It is found in Sri Lanka, India, Seychelles, Myanmar, Thailand, and Polynesia.
