= Eocene =

Second epoch of the Paleogene Period

- 56.00 – 33.9/33.7 Ma
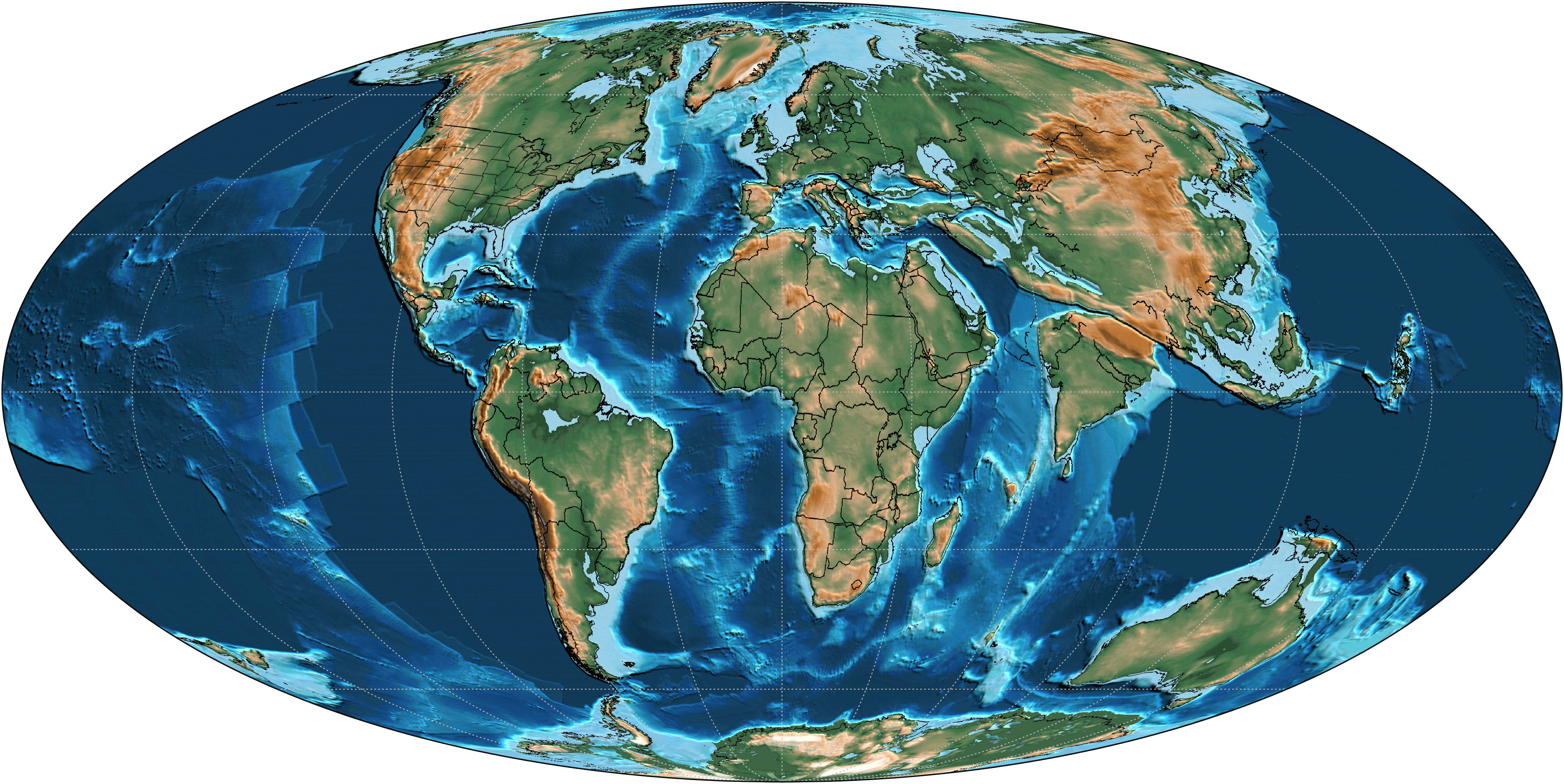
- A map of Earth 45 million years ago during the Eocene Epoch, Lutetian Age

Chronology
| ← / PETM; ← / First Antarctic permanent ice-sheets; ← / K-Pg mass extinction |
Subdivision of the Paleogene according to the ICS, as of 2024. Vertical axis scale: Millions of years ago

Etymology
- Name formality: Formal

Usage information
- Celestial body: Earth
- Regional usage: Global (ICS)
- Time scale(s) used: ICS Time Scale

Definition
- Chronological unit: Epoch
- Stratigraphic unit: Series
- Time span formality: Formal
- Lower boundary definition: Strong negative anomaly in δ^{13}C values at the PETM
- Lower boundary GSSP: Dababiya section, Luxor, Egypt; 25.5000°N 32.5311°E
- Lower GSSP ratified: 2003
- Upper boundary definition: LAD of Planktonic Foraminifers Hantkenina and Cribrohantkenina
- Upper boundary GSSP: Massignano quarry section, Massignano, Ancona, Italy; 43.5328°N 13.6011°E
- Upper GSSP ratified: 1992

The Eocene (IPA: /ˈiːəsiːn, ˈiːoʊ-/ EE-ə-seen, EE-oh-) is a geological epoch that began about 56 million years ago (Ma). It is the second epoch of the Paleogene Period in the modern Cenozoic Era. The end point of the Eocene is the Eocene-Oligocene transition (EOT), between 33.9 and 33.4 Ma. Precise boundaries between the epochs are sometimes given at 33.9 or 33.7 Ma.

The Eocene spans the time from the end of the Paleocene Epoch to the beginning of the Oligocene Epoch. The start of the Eocene is marked by a brief period in which the concentration of the carbon isotope ^{13}C in the atmosphere was exceptionally low in comparison with the more common isotope ^{12}C. The average temperature of Earth at the beginning of the Eocene was about 27 degrees Celsius. The end is set at a major extinction event called the Grande Coupure (the "Great Break" in continuity) or the Eocene–Oligocene extinction event, which may be related to the impact of one or more large bolides in Siberia and in what is now Chesapeake Bay. As with other geologic periods, the strata that define the start and end of the epoch are well identified, though their exact dates are slightly uncertain.

== Etymology ==
The term "Eocene" is derived from Ancient Greek ἠώς (ēṓs), lit. 'dawn', and καινός (kainós), lit. 'new', as the epoch saw the dawn of recent, or modern, life.

Scottish geologist Charles Lyell (ignoring the Quaternary) divided the Tertiary Epoch into the Eocene, Miocene, Pliocene, and New Pliocene (Holocene) Periods in 1833. (Note: In Lyell's time, epochs were divided into periods. In modern geology, periods are divided into epochs.) British geologist John Phillips proposed the Cenozoic in 1840 in place of the Tertiary, and Austrian paleontologist Moritz Hörnes introduced the Paleogene for the Eocene and Neogene for the Miocene and Pliocene in 1853. After decades of inconsistent usage, the newly formed International Commission on Stratigraphy (ICS), in 1969, standardized stratigraphy based on the prevailing opinions in Europe: the Cenozoic Era subdivided into the Tertiary and Quaternary sub-eras, and the Tertiary subdivided into the Paleogene and Neogene periods. In 1978, the Paleogene was officially defined as the Paleocene, Eocene, and Oligocene epochs; and the Neogene as the Miocene and Pliocene epochs. In 1989, Tertiary and Quaternary were removed from the time scale due to the arbitrary nature of their boundary, but Quaternary was reinstated in 2009.

== Geology ==
=== Boundaries ===
The Eocene is a dynamic epoch that represents global climatic transitions between two climatic extremes, transitioning from the hot house to the cold house. The beginning of the Eocene is marked by the Paleocene–Eocene Thermal Maximum, a short period of intense warming and ocean acidification brought about by the release of carbon en masse into the atmosphere and ocean systems, which led to a mass extinction of 30–50% of benthic foraminifera (single-celled species which are used as bioindicators of the health of a marine ecosystem) –one of the largest of the Cenozoic. This event happened around 55.8 Ma, and was one of the most significant periods of global change during the Cenozoic.

The middle Eocene was characterized by the shift towards a cooler climate at the end of the Early Eocene Climatic Optimum, around 47.8 Ma, which was briefly interrupted by another warming event, the Middle Eocene Climatic Optimum. Lasting for about 400,000 years, the MECO was responsible for a globally uniform 4° to 6 °C warming of both the surface and deep oceans, as inferred from foraminiferal stable oxygen isotope records. The resumption of a long-term gradual cooling trend resulted in a glacial maximum at the late Eocene/early Oligocene boundary.

The end of the Eocene was also marked by the Eocene–Oligocene extinction event, also known as the Grande Coupure.

=== Stratigraphy ===
The Eocene is conventionally divided into early (56–47.8 Ma), middle (47.8–38 Ma), and late (38–33.9 Ma) subdivisions. The corresponding rocks are referred to as lower, middle, and upper Eocene. The Ypresian Stage constitutes the lower, the Priabonian Stage the upper; and the Lutetian and Bartonian stages are united as the middle Eocene.

The Western North American floras of the Eocene were divided into four floral "stages" by Jack Wolfe (1968) based on work with the Puget Group fossils of King County, Washington. The four stages, Franklinian, Fultonian, Ravenian, and Kummerian covered the Early Eocene through early Oligocene, and three of the four were given informal early/late substages. Wolfe tentatively deemed the Franklinian as Early Eocene, the Fultonian as Middle Eocene, the Ravenian as Late, and the Kummerian as Early Oligocene. The beginning of the Kummerian was refined by Gregory Retallack et al (2004) as 40 Mya, with a refined end at the Eocene-Oligocene boundary where the younger Angoonian floral stage starts.

== Palaeogeography and tectonics ==
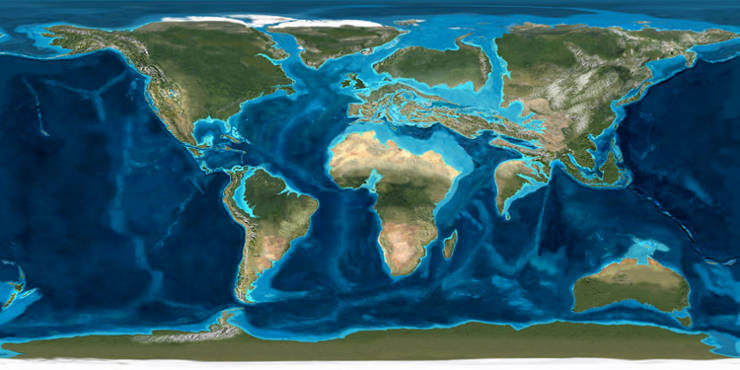
A map of Earth in the early Eocene (50 Ma)

During the Eocene, the continents continued to drift toward their present positions. At the beginning of the period, Australia and Antarctica remained connected, and warm equatorial currents may have mixed with colder Antarctic waters, distributing the heat around the planet and keeping global temperatures high. When Australia split from the southern continent around 45 Ma, the warm equatorial currents were routed away from Antarctica, and an isolated cold water channel developed between the two continents. However, modeling results call into question the thermal isolation model for late Eocene cooling, and decreasing carbon dioxide levels in the atmosphere may have been more important. Once the Antarctic region began to cool down, the ocean surrounding Antarctica began to freeze, sending cold water and icefloes north and reinforcing the cooling.

The northern supercontinent of Laurasia began to fragment, as Europe, Greenland and North America drifted apart.

In western North America, the Laramide Orogeny came to an end in the Eocene, and compression was replaced with crustal extension that ultimately gave rise to the Basin and Range Province. The Kishenehn Basin, around 1.5 km in elevation during the Lutetian, was uplifted to an altitude of 2.5 km by the Priabonian. Huge lakes formed in the high flat basins among uplifts, resulting in the deposition of the Green River Formation lagerstätte.

At about 35 Ma, an asteroid impact on the eastern coast of North America formed the Chesapeake Bay impact crater.

The Tethys Ocean finally closed with the collision of Africa and Eurasia, while the uplift of the Alps isolated its final remnant, the Mediterranean, and created another shallow sea with island archipelagos to the north. Planktonic foraminifera in the northwestern Peri-Tethys are very similar to those of the Tethys in the middle Lutetian but become completely disparate in the Bartonian, indicating biogeographic separation. Though the North Atlantic was opening, a land connection appears to have remained between North America and Europe since the faunas of the two regions are very similar.

Eurasia was separated in three different landmasses 50 Ma; Western Europe, Balkanatolia and Asia. About 40 Ma, Balkanatolia and Asia were connected, while Europe was connected 34 Ma. The Fushun Basin contained large, suboxic lakes known as the paleo-Jijuntun Lakes.

India collided with Asia, folding to initiate formation of the Himalayas. The incipient subcontinent collided with the Kohistan–Ladakh Arc around 50.2 Ma and with Karakoram around 40.4 Ma, with the final collision between Asia and India occurring ~40 Ma.

== Climate ==
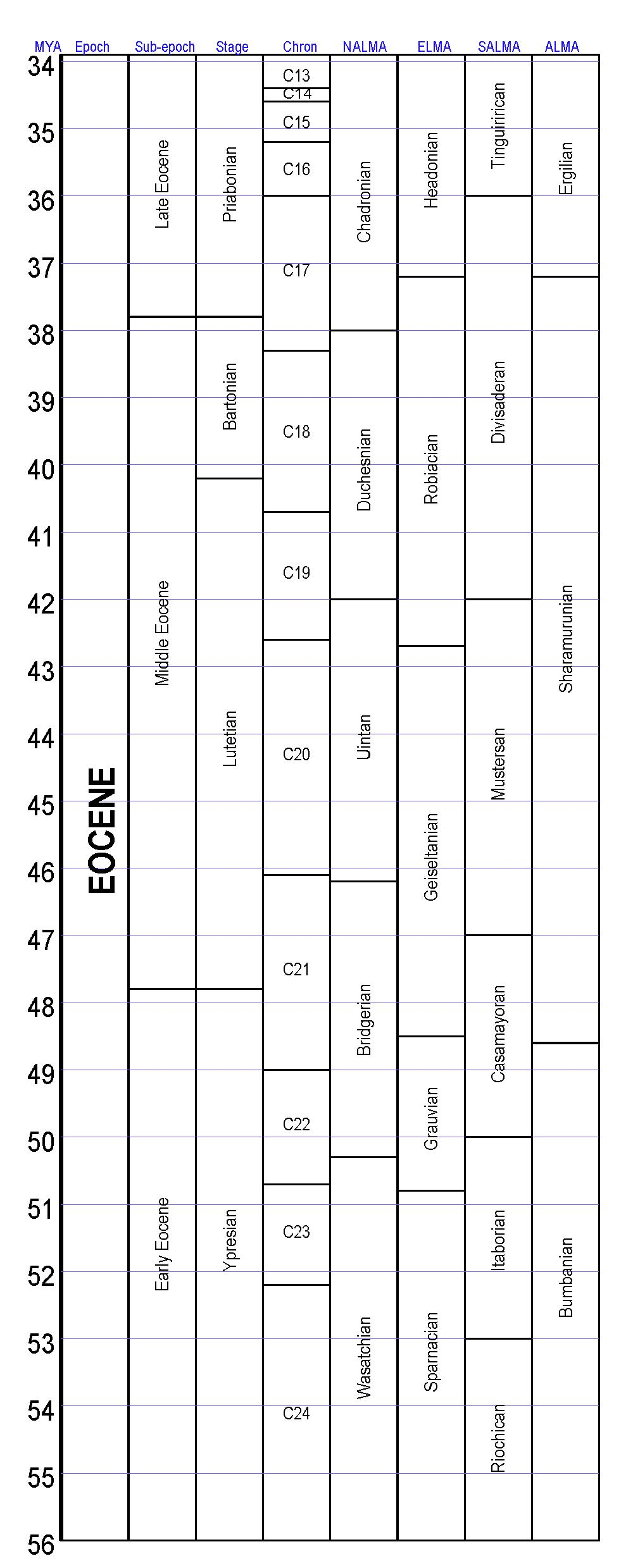
Subdivisions of the Eocene

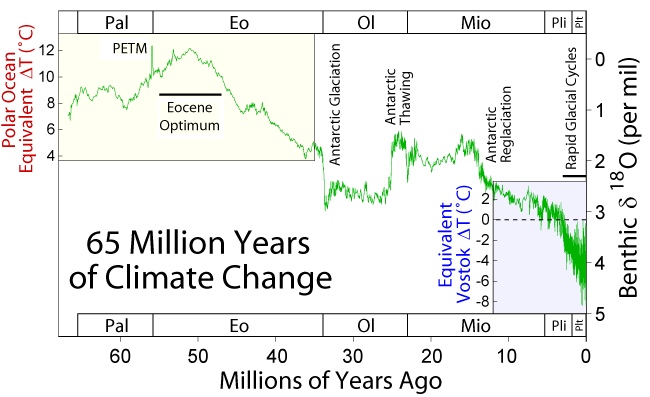
Climate change during the last 65 million years

The Eocene epoch contained a wide variety of climate conditions that includes the warmest climate in the Cenozoic Era, and arguably the warmest time interval since the Permian-Triassic mass extinction and Early Triassic, and ends in an icehouse climate. The evolution of the Eocene climate began with warming after the end of the Paleocene–Eocene Thermal Maximum (PETM) at 56 Ma to a maximum during the Eocene Optimum at around 49 Ma. During this period of time, little to no ice was present on Earth with a smaller difference in temperature from the equator to the poles. Because of this the maximum sea level was 150 meters higher than current levels. Following the maximum was a descent into an icehouse climate from the Eocene Optimum to the Eocene–Oligocene transition at 34 Ma. During this decrease, ice began to reappear at the poles, and the Eocene–Oligocene transition is the period of time when the Antarctic ice sheet began to rapidly expand.

=== Early Eocene ===
Greenhouse gases, in particular carbon dioxide and methane, played a significant role during the Eocene in controlling the surface temperature. The end of the PETM was met with very large sequestration of carbon dioxide into the forms of methane clathrate, coal, and crude oil at the bottom of the Arctic Ocean, that reduced the atmospheric carbon dioxide. This event was similar in magnitude to the massive release of greenhouse gasses at the beginning of the PETM, and it is hypothesized that the sequestration was mainly due to organic carbon burial and weathering of silicates. For the early Eocene there is much discussion on how much carbon dioxide was in the atmosphere. This is due to numerous proxies representing different atmospheric carbon dioxide content. For example, diverse geochemical and paleontological proxies indicate that at the maximum of global warmth the atmospheric carbon dioxide values were at 700–900 ppm, while model simulations suggest a concentration of 1,680 ppm fits best with deep sea, sea surface, and near-surface air temperatures of the time. Other proxies such as pedogenic (soil building) carbonate and marine boron isotopes indicate large changes of carbon dioxide of over 2,000 ppm over periods of time of less than 1 million years. This large influx of carbon dioxide could be attributed to volcanic out-gassing due to North Atlantic rifting or oxidation of methane stored in large reservoirs deposited from the PETM event in the sea floor or wetland environments. For contrast, today the carbon dioxide levels are at 400 ppm or 0.04%.

During the early Eocene, methane was another greenhouse gas that had a drastic effect on the climate. Methane has 30 times more of a warming effect than carbon dioxide on a 100-year scale (i.e., methane has a global warming potential of 29.8±11). Most of the methane released to the atmosphere during this period of time would have been from wetlands, swamps, and forests. The atmospheric methane concentration today is 0.000179% or 1.79 ppmv. As a result of the warmer climate and the sea level rise associated with the early Eocene, more wetlands, more forests, and more coal deposits would have been available for methane release. If we compare the early Eocene production of methane to current levels of atmospheric methane, the early Eocene would have produced triple the amount of methane. The warm temperatures during the early Eocene could have increased methane production rates, and methane that is released into the atmosphere would in turn warm the troposphere, cool the stratosphere, and produce water vapor and carbon dioxide through oxidation. Biogenic production of methane produces carbon dioxide and water vapor along with the methane, as well as yielding infrared radiation. The breakdown of methane in an atmosphere containing oxygen produces carbon monoxide, water vapor and infrared radiation. The carbon monoxide is not stable, so it eventually becomes carbon dioxide and in doing so releases yet more infrared radiation. Water vapor traps more infrared than does carbon dioxide. At about the beginning of the Eocene Epoch (55.8–33.9 Ma) the amount of oxygen in the Earth's atmosphere more or less doubled.

During the warming in the early Eocene between 55 and 52 Ma, there were a series of short-term changes of carbon isotope composition in the ocean. These isotope changes occurred due to the release of carbon from the ocean into the atmosphere that led to a temperature increase of 4–8 °C (7.2–14.4 °F) at the surface of the ocean. Recent analysis of and research into these hyperthermals in the early Eocene has led to hypotheses that the hyperthermals are based on orbital parameters, in particular eccentricity and obliquity. The hyperthermals in the early Eocene, notably the Palaeocene–Eocene Thermal Maximum (PETM), the Eocene Thermal Maximum 2 (ETM2), and the Eocene Thermal Maximum 3 (ETM3), were analyzed and found that orbital control may have had a role in triggering the ETM2 and ETM3. An enhancement of the biological pump proved effective at sequestering excess carbon during the recovery phases of these hyperthermals. These hyperthermals led to increased perturbations in planktonic and benthic foraminifera, with a higher rate of fluvial sedimentation as a consequence of the warmer temperatures. Unlike the PETM, the lesser hyperthermals of the Early Eocene had negligible consequences for terrestrial mammals. These Early Eocene hyperthermals produced a sustained period of extremely hot climate known as the Early Eocene Climatic Optimum (EECO). During the early and middle EECO, the superabundance of the euryhaline dinocyst Homotryblium in New Zealand indicates elevated ocean salinity in the region.

==== Equable climate problem ====
One of the unique features of the Eocene's climate was the equable and homogeneous climate that existed in the early parts of the Eocene. A multitude of proxies support the presence of a warmer equable climate being present during this period of time. A few of these proxies include the presence of fossils native to warm climates, such as crocodiles, located in the higher latitudes, the presence in the high latitudes of frost-intolerant flora such as palm trees which cannot survive during sustained freezes, and fossils of snakes found in the tropics that would require much higher average temperatures to sustain them. TEX_{86} BAYSPAR measurements indicate extremely high sea surface temperatures of 40 °C (104 °F) to 45 °C (113 °F) at low latitudes, although clumped isotope analyses point to a maximum low latitude sea surface temperature of 36.3 °C (97.3 °F) ± 1.9 °C (3.4 °F) during the EECO. Relative to present-day values, bottom water temperatures are 10 °C (18 °F) higher according to isotope proxies. With these bottom water temperatures, temperatures in areas where deep water forms near the poles are unable to be much cooler than the bottom water temperatures.

An issue arises, however, when trying to model the Eocene and reproduce the results that are found with the proxy data. Using all different ranges of greenhouse gasses that occurred during the early Eocene, models were unable to produce the warming that was found at the poles and the reduced seasonality that occurs with winters at the poles being substantially warmer. The models, while accurately predicting the tropics, tend to produce significantly cooler temperatures of up to 20 °C (36 °F) colder than the actual determined temperature at the poles. This error has been classified as the "equable climate problem". To solve this problem, the solution would involve finding a process to warm the poles without warming the tropics. Some hypotheses and tests which attempt to find the process are listed below.

===== Large lakes =====
Due to the nature of water as opposed to land, less temperature variability would be present if a large body of water is also present. In an attempt to try to mitigate the cooling polar temperatures, large lakes were proposed to mitigate seasonal climate changes. To replicate this case, a lake was inserted into North America and a climate model was run using varying carbon dioxide levels. The model runs concluded that while the lake did reduce the seasonality of the region greater than just an increase in carbon dioxide, the addition of a large lake was unable to reduce the seasonality to the levels shown by the floral and faunal data.

===== Ocean heat transport =====
The transport of heat from the tropics to the poles, much like how ocean heat transport functions in modern times, was considered a possibility for the increased temperature and reduced seasonality for the poles. With the increased sea surface temperatures and the increased temperature of the deep ocean water during the early Eocene, one common hypothesis was that due to these increases there would be a greater transport of heat from the tropics to the poles. Simulating these differences, the models produced lower heat transport due to the lower temperature gradients and were unsuccessful in producing an equable climate from only ocean heat transport.

===== Orbital parameters =====
While typically seen as a control on ice growth and seasonality, the orbital parameters were theorized as a possible control on continental temperatures and seasonality. Simulating the Eocene by using an ice free planet, eccentricity, obliquity, and precession were modified in different model runs to determine all the possible different scenarios that could occur and their effects on temperature. One particular case led to warmer winters and cooler summer by up to 30% in the North American continent, and it reduced the seasonal variation of temperature by up to 75%. While orbital parameters did not produce the warming at the poles, the parameters did show a great effect on seasonality and needed to be considered.

===== Polar stratospheric clouds =====
Another method considered for producing the warm polar temperatures were polar stratospheric clouds. Polar stratospheric clouds are clouds that occur in the lower stratosphere at very low temperatures. Polar stratospheric clouds have a great impact on radiative forcing. Due to their minimal albedo properties and their optical thickness, polar stratospheric clouds act similar to a greenhouse gas and trap outgoing longwave radiation. Different types of polar stratospheric clouds occur in the atmosphere: polar stratospheric clouds that are created due to interactions with nitric or sulfuric acid and water (Type I) or polar stratospheric clouds that are created with only water ice (Type II).

Methane is an important factor in the creation of the primary Type II polar stratospheric clouds that were created in the early Eocene. Since water vapor is the only supporting substance used in Type II polar stratospheric clouds, the presence of water vapor in the lower stratosphere is necessary where in most situations the presence of water vapor in the lower stratosphere is rare. When methane is oxidized, a significant amount of water vapor is released. Another requirement for polar stratospheric clouds is cold temperatures to ensure condensation and cloud production. Polar stratospheric cloud production, since it requires the cold temperatures, is usually limited to nighttime and winter conditions. With this combination of wetter and colder conditions in the lower stratosphere, polar stratospheric clouds could have formed over wide areas in Polar Regions.

To test the polar stratospheric clouds effects on the Eocene climate, models were run comparing the effects of polar stratospheric clouds at the poles to an increase in atmospheric carbon dioxide. The polar stratospheric clouds had a warming effect on the poles, increasing temperatures by up to 20 °C in the winter months. A multitude of feedbacks also occurred in the models due to the polar stratospheric clouds' presence. Any ice growth was slowed immensely and would lead to any present ice melting. Only the poles were affected with the change in temperature and the tropics were unaffected, which with an increase in atmospheric carbon dioxide would also cause the tropics to increase in temperature. Due to the warming of the troposphere from the increased greenhouse effect of the polar stratospheric clouds, the stratosphere would cool and would potentially increase the amount of polar stratospheric clouds.

While the polar stratospheric clouds could explain the reduction of the equator to pole temperature gradient and the increased temperatures at the poles during the early Eocene, there are a few drawbacks to maintaining polar stratospheric clouds for an extended period of time. Separate model runs were used to determine the sustainability of the polar stratospheric clouds. It was determined that in order to maintain the lower stratospheric water vapor, methane would need to be continually released and sustained. In addition, the amounts of ice and condensation nuclei would need to be high in order for the polar stratospheric cloud to sustain itself and eventually expand.

=== Middle Eocene ===
The Eocene is not only known for containing the warmest period during the Cenozoic; it also marked the decline into an icehouse climate and the rapid expansion of the Antarctic ice sheet. The transition from a warming climate into a cooling climate began at around 49 Ma. Isotopes of carbon and oxygen indicate a shift to a global cooling climate. The cause of the cooling has been attributed to a significant decrease of >2,000 ppm in atmospheric carbon dioxide concentrations. One proposed cause of the reduction in carbon dioxide during the warming to cooling transition was the azolla event. With the equable climate during the early Eocene, warm temperatures in the arctic allowed for the growth of azolla, which is a floating aquatic fern, on the Arctic Ocean. The significantly high amounts of carbon dioxide also acted to facilitate azolla blooms across the Arctic Ocean. Compared to current carbon dioxide levels, these azolla grew rapidly in the enhanced carbon dioxide levels found in the early Eocene. The isolation of the Arctic Ocean, evidenced by euxinia that occurred at this time, led to stagnant waters and as the azolla sank to the sea floor, they became part of the sediments on the seabed and effectively sequestered the carbon by locking it out of the atmosphere for good. The ability for the azolla to sequester carbon is exceptional, and the enhanced burial of azolla could have had a significant effect on the world atmospheric carbon content and may have been the event to begin the transition into an ice house climate. The azolla event could have led to a draw down of atmospheric carbon dioxide of up to 470 ppm. Assuming the carbon dioxide concentrations were at 900 ppmv prior to the Azolla Event they would have dropped to 430 ppmv, or 30 ppmv more than they are today, after the Azolla Event. This cooling trend at the end of the EECO has also been proposed to have been caused by increased siliceous plankton productivity and marine carbon burial, which also helped draw carbon dioxide out of the atmosphere. Cooling after this event, part of a trend known as the Middle-Late Eocene Cooling (MLEC), continued due to continual decrease in atmospheric carbon dioxide from organic productivity and weathering from mountain building. Many regions of the world became more arid and cold over the course of the stage, such as the Fushun Basin. In East Asia, lake level changes were in sync with global sea level changes over the course of the MLEC.

Global cooling continued until there was a major reversal from cooling to warming in the Bartonian. This warming event, signifying a sudden and temporary reversal of the cooling conditions, is known as the Middle Eocene Climatic Optimum (MECO). At around 41.5 Ma, stable isotopic analysis of samples from Southern Ocean drilling sites indicated a warming event for 600,000 years. A similar shift in carbon isotopes is known from the Northern Hemisphere in the Scaglia Limestones of Italy. Oxygen isotope analysis showed a large negative change in the proportion of heavier oxygen isotopes to lighter oxygen isotopes, which indicates an increase in global temperatures. The warming is considered to be primarily due to carbon dioxide increases, because carbon isotope signatures rule out major methane release during this short-term warming. A sharp increase in atmospheric carbon dioxide was observed with a maximum of 4,000 ppm: the highest amount of atmospheric carbon dioxide detected during the Eocene. Other studies suggest a more modest rise in carbon dioxide levels. The increase in atmospheric carbon dioxide has also been hypothesised to have been driven by increased seafloor spreading rates and metamorphic decarbonation reactions between Australia and Antarctica and increased amounts of volcanism in the region. One possible cause of atmospheric carbon dioxide increase could have been a sudden increase due to metamorphic release due to continental drift and collision of India with Asia and the resulting formation of the Himalayas; however, data on the exact timing of metamorphic release of atmospheric carbon dioxide is not well resolved in the data. Recent studies have mentioned, however, that the removal of the ocean between Asia and India could have released significant amounts of carbon dioxide. Another hypothesis still implicates a diminished negative feedback of silicate weathering as a result of continental rocks having become less weatherable during the warm Early and Middle Eocene, allowing volcanically released carbon dioxide to persist in the atmosphere for longer. Yet another explanation hypothesises that MECO warming was caused by the simultaneous occurrence of minima in both the 400 kyr and 2.4 Myr eccentricity cycles. During the MECO, sea surface temperatures in the Tethys Ocean jumped to 32–36 °C, and Tethyan seawater became more dysoxic. A decline in carbonate accumulation at ocean depths of greater than three kilometres took place synchronously with the peak of the MECO, signifying ocean acidification took place in the deep ocean. On top of that, MECO warming caused an increase in the respiration rates of pelagic heterotrophs, leading to a decreased proportion of primary productivity making its way down to the seafloor and causing a corresponding decline in populations of benthic foraminifera. An abrupt decrease in lakewater salinity in western North America occurred during this warming interval. This warming is short lived, as benthic oxygen isotope records indicate a return to cooling at ~40 Ma.

=== Late Eocene ===
At the end of the MECO, the MLEC resumed. Cooling and the carbon dioxide drawdown continued through the late Eocene and into the Eocene–Oligocene transition around 34 Ma. The post-MECO cooling brought with it a major aridification trend in Asia, enhanced by retreating seas. A monsoonal climate remained predominant in East Asia. The cooling during the initial stages of the opening of the Drake Passage ~38.5 Ma was not global, as evidenced by an absence of cooling in the North Atlantic. During the cooling period, benthic oxygen isotopes show the possibility of ice creation and ice increase during this later cooling. The end of the Eocene and beginning of the Oligocene is marked with the massive expansion of area of the Antarctic ice sheet that was a major step into the icehouse climate. Multiple proxies, such as oxygen isotopes and alkenones, indicate that at the Eocene–Oligocene transition, the atmospheric carbon dioxide concentration had decreased to around 750–800 ppm, approximately twice that of present levels. Along with the decrease of atmospheric carbon dioxide reducing the global temperature, orbital factors in ice creation can be seen with 100,000-year and 400,000-year fluctuations in benthic oxygen isotope records. Another major contribution to the expansion of the ice sheet was the creation of the Antarctic Circumpolar Current. The creation of the Antarctic circumpolar current would isolate the cold water around the Antarctic, which would reduce heat transport to the Antarctic along with creating ocean gyres that result in the upwelling of colder bottom waters. The issue with this hypothesis of the consideration of this being a factor for the Eocene-Oligocene transition is the timing of the creation of the circulation is uncertain. For Drake Passage, sediments indicate the opening occurred ~41 Ma while tectonics indicate that this occurred ~32 Ma. Solar activity did not change significantly during the greenhouse-icehouse transition across the Eocene-Oligocene boundary.

== Flora ==
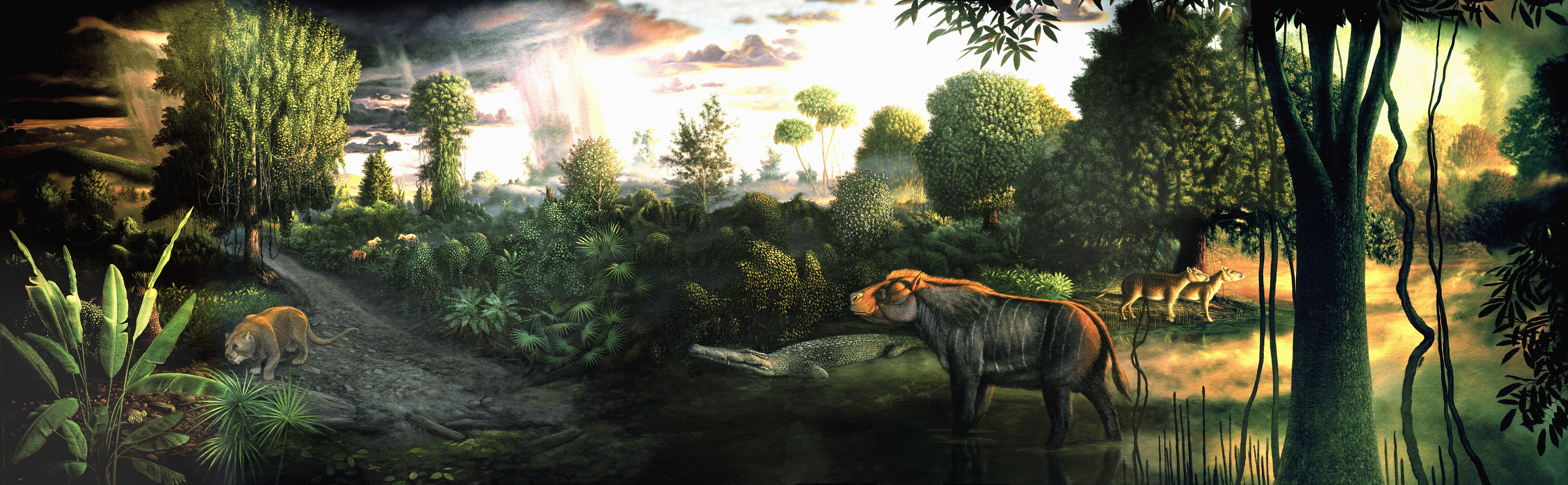
Eocene vegetation of the Clarno Nut Beds in John Day Fossil Beds National Monument was humid subtropical forest vegetation of high diversity dominated by angiosperms.

During the early-middle Eocene, forests covered most of the Earth including the poles. Tropical forests extended across much of modern Africa, South America, Central America, India, South-east Asia and China. Paratropical forests grew over North America, Europe and Russia, with broad-leafed evergreen and broad-leafed deciduous forests at higher latitudes.

Polar forests were quite extensive. Fossils and even preserved remains of trees such as swamp cypress and dawn redwood from the Eocene have been found on Ellesmere Island in the Arctic. Even at that time, Ellesmere Island was only a few degrees in latitude further south than it is today. Fossils of subtropical and even tropical trees and plants from the Eocene also have been found in Greenland and Alaska. Tropical rainforests grew as far north as northern North America and Europe.

Palm trees were growing as far north as Alaska and northern Europe during the early Eocene, although they became less abundant as the climate cooled. Dawn redwoods were far more extensive as well.

The earliest definitive Eucalyptus fossils were dated from 51.9 Ma, and were found in the Laguna del Hunco deposit in Chubut province in Argentina.

Cooling began mid-period, and by the end of the Eocene continental interiors had begun to dry, with forests thinning considerably in some areas. The newly evolved grasses began to expand during the climatic cooling and drying following the extreme warmth of the EECO, with subhumid savannas being known from South America since the Middle Eocene.

The cooling also brought seasonal changes. Deciduous trees, better able to cope with large temperature changes, began to overtake evergreen tropical species. By the end of the period, deciduous forests covered large parts of the northern continents, including North America, Eurasia and the Arctic, and rainforests held on only in equatorial South America, Africa, India and Australia.

Antarctica began the Eocene fringed with a warm temperate to sub-tropical rainforest. Pollen found in Prydz Bay from the Eocene suggest taiga forest existed there. It became much colder as the period progressed; the heat-loving tropical flora was wiped out, and by the beginning of the Oligocene, the continent hosted deciduous forests and vast stretches of tundra.

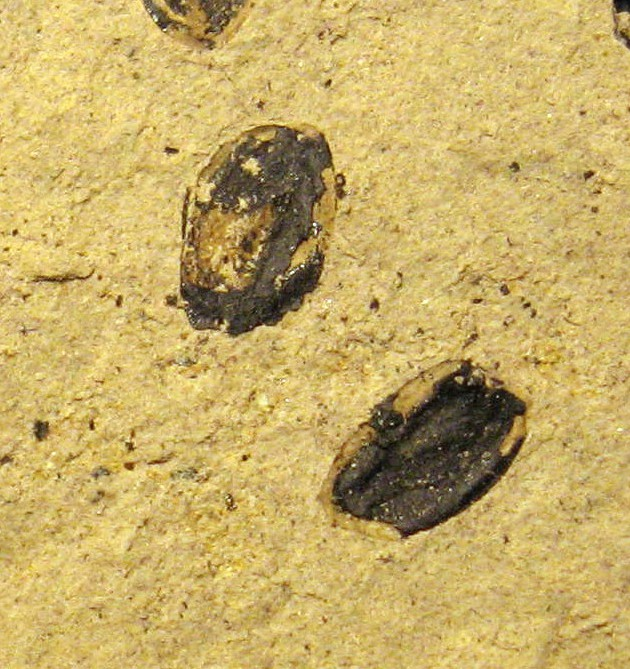
Nuphar seeds, Nymphaeaceae, Ypresian

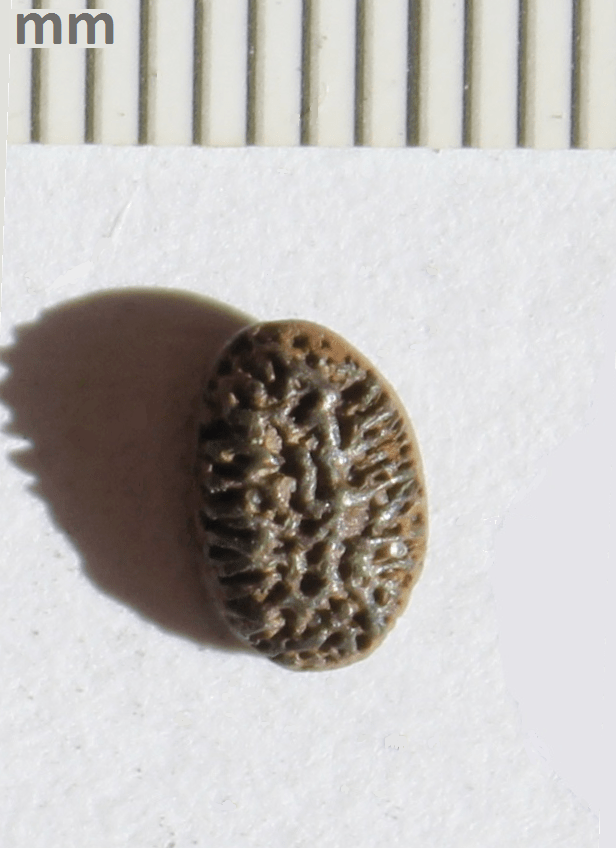
Iodes tree seed, Icacinaceae, London Clay

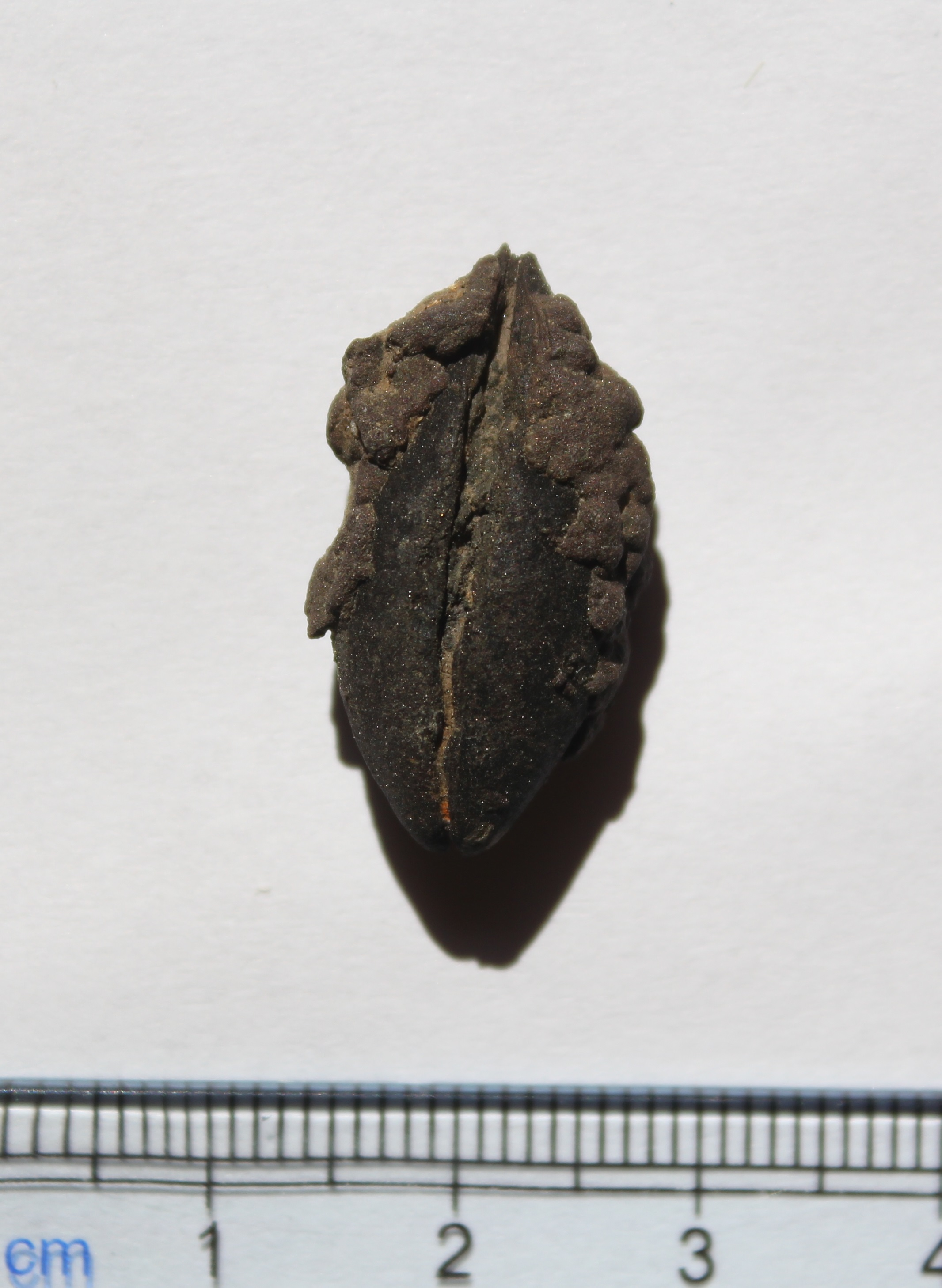
Mastixia tree seed, Nyssaceae, London Clay

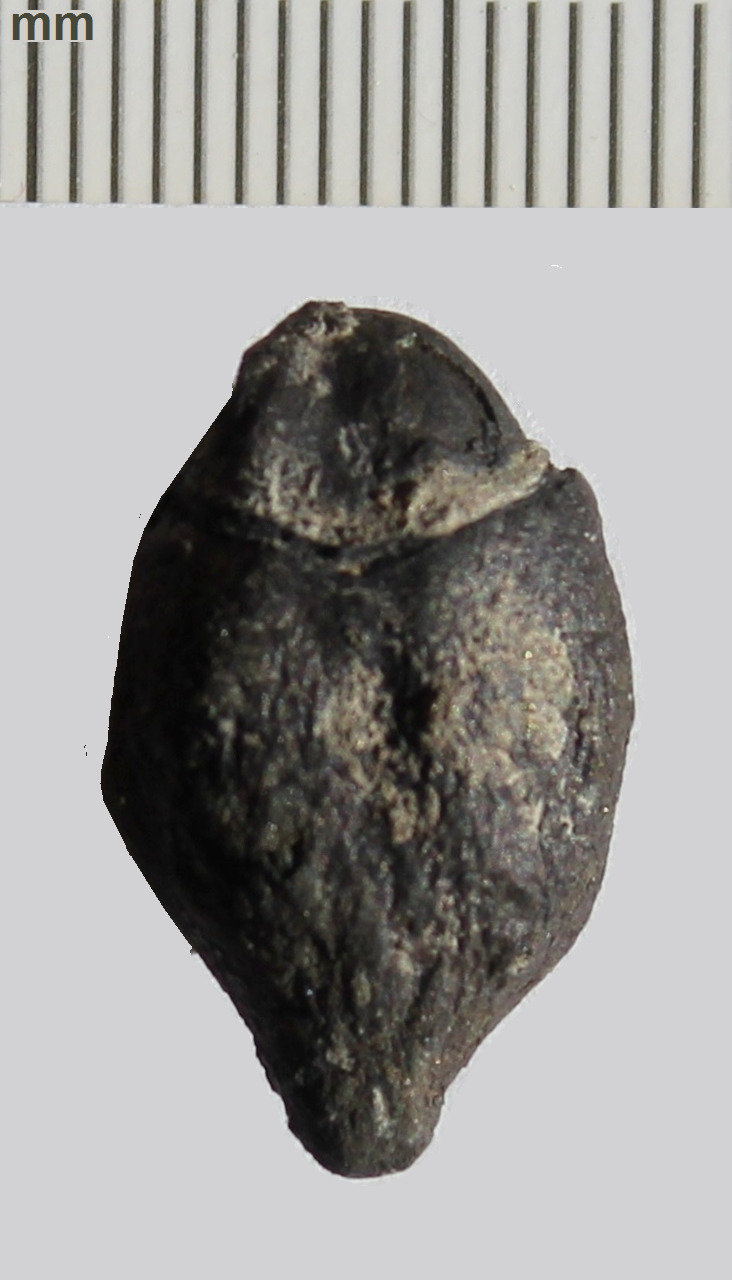
Ocotea tree seed, Lauraceae, London clay

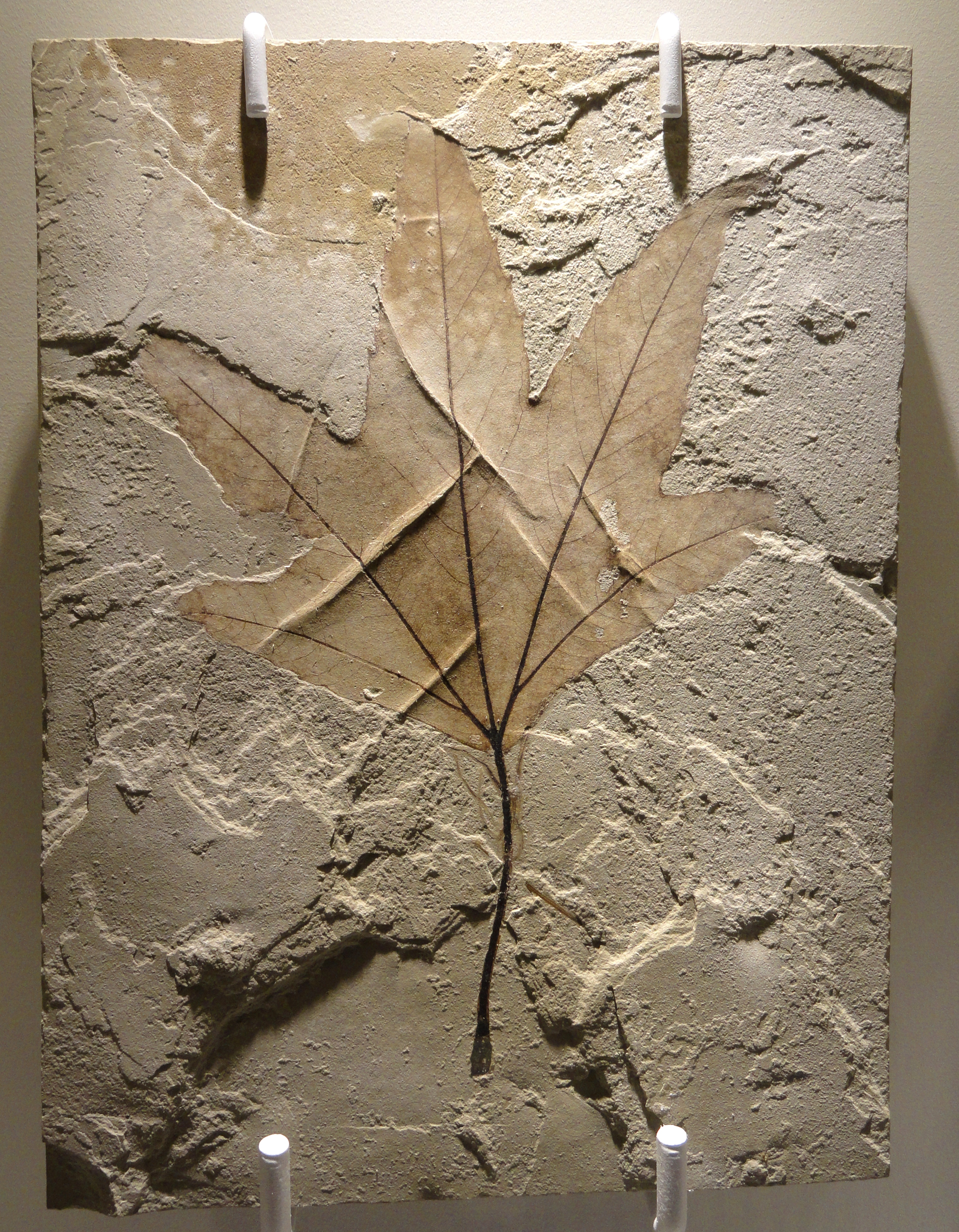
Macginitiea leaf, Platanaceae, Clarno Formation, Oregon

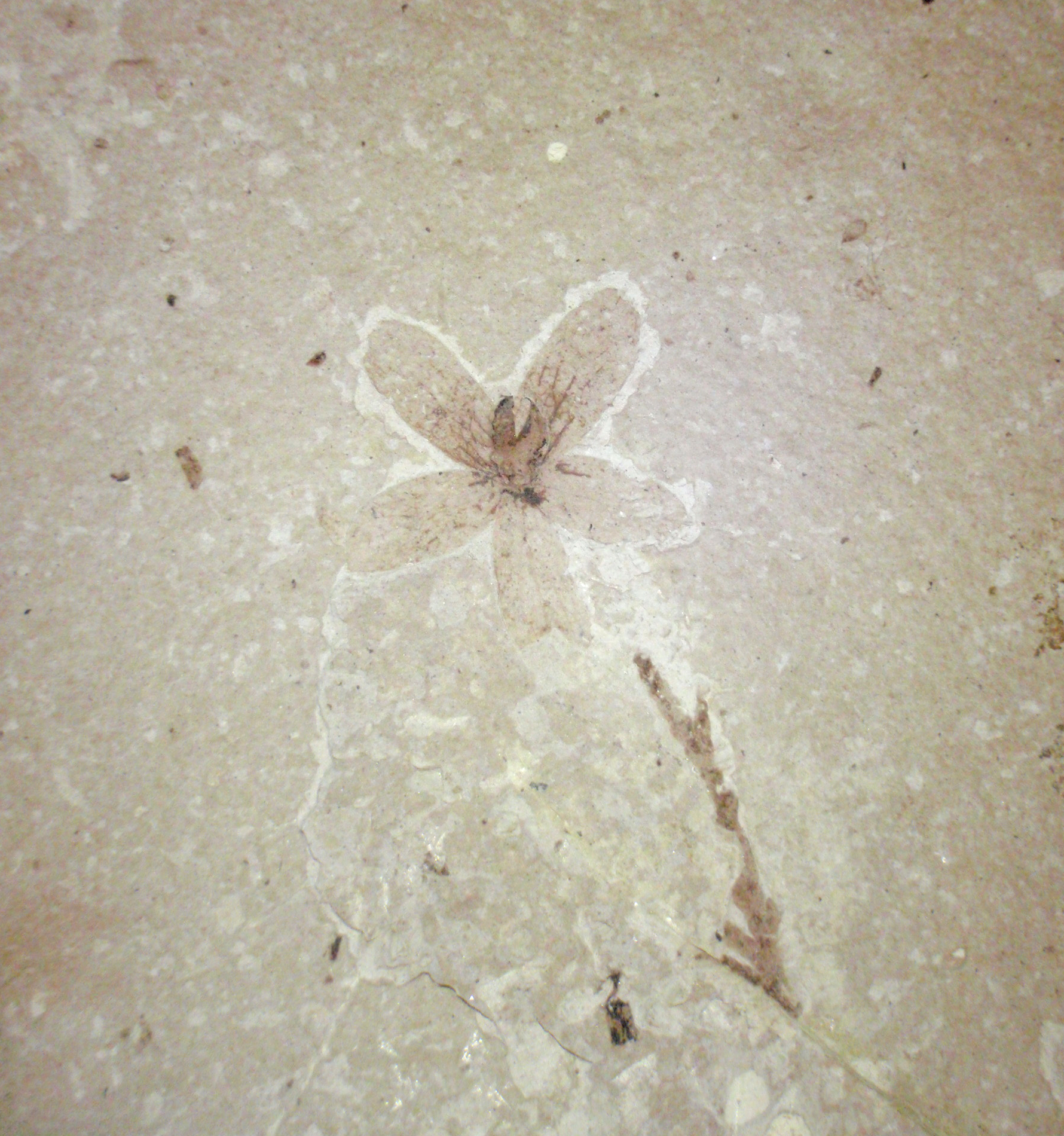
Flower, Florissant Formation, Colorado

== Fauna ==
During the Eocene, plants and marine faunas became quite modern. Many modern bird orders first appeared in the Eocene. The Eocene oceans were warm and teeming with fish and other sea life.

=== Vertebrates ===
==== Mammals ====
The oldest known fossils of most of the modern mammal orders appear within a brief period during the early Eocene. At the beginning of the Eocene, several new mammal groups arrived in North America. These modern mammals, like artiodactyls, perissodactyls, and primates, had features like long, thin legs, feet, and hands capable of grasping, as well as differentiated teeth adapted for chewing. Dwarf forms reigned. All the members of the new mammal orders were small, under 10 kg; based on comparisons of tooth size, Eocene mammals were only 60% of the size of the primitive Palaeocene mammals that preceded them. They were also smaller than the mammals that followed them. It is assumed that the hot Eocene temperatures favored smaller animals that were better able to manage the heat.

Rodents were widespread. East Asian rodent faunas declined in diversity when they shifted from ctenodactyloid-dominant to cricetid–dipodid-dominant after the MECO.

Both groups of modern ungulates (hoofed animals) became prevalent because of a major radiation between Europe and North America, along with carnivorous ungulates like Mesonyx. Early forms of many other modern mammalian orders appeared, including horses (most notably the Eohippus), bats, proboscidians (elephants), primates, and rodents. Older primitive forms of mammals declined in variety and importance. Important Eocene land fauna fossil remains have been found in western North America, Europe, Patagonia, Egypt, and southeast Asia. Marine fauna are best known from South Asia and the southeast United States.

After the Paleocene–Eocene Thermal Maximum, members of the Equoidea arose in North America and Europe, giving rise to some of the earliest equids such as Sifrhippus and basal European equoids such as the palaeothere Hyracotherium. Some of the later equoids were especially species-rich; Palaeotherium, ranging from small to very large in size, is known from as many as 16 species.

Established large-sized mammals of the Eocene include the Uintatherium, Arsinoitherium, and brontotheres, in which the former two, unlike the latter, did not belong to ungulates but groups that became extinct shortly after their establishments.

Large terrestrial mammalian predators had already existed since the Paleocene, but new forms now arose like Hyaenodon and Daphoenus (the earliest lineage of a once-successful predatory family known as bear dogs). Entelodonts meanwhile established themselves as some of the largest omnivores. The first nimravids, including Dinictis, established themselves as amongst the first feliforms to appear. Their groups became highly successful and continued to live past the Eocene.

Basilosaurus is a well-known Eocene whale, but whales as a group had become very diverse during the Eocene, which is when the major transitions from being terrestrial to fully aquatic in cetaceans occurred. The first sirenians were evolving at this time, and would eventually evolve into the extant manatees and dugongs.

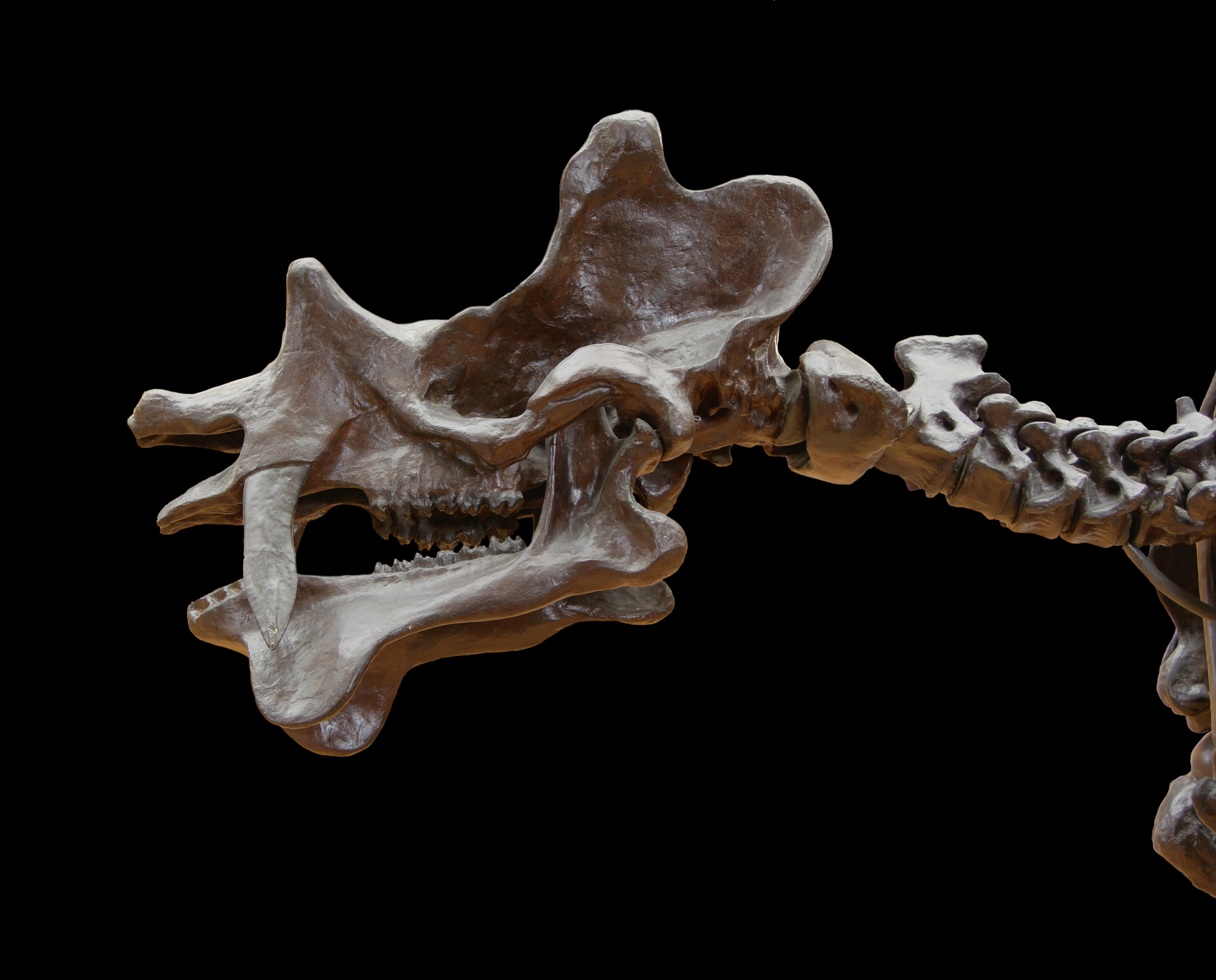
Cast of skull of Uintatherium anceps, a dinoceratan

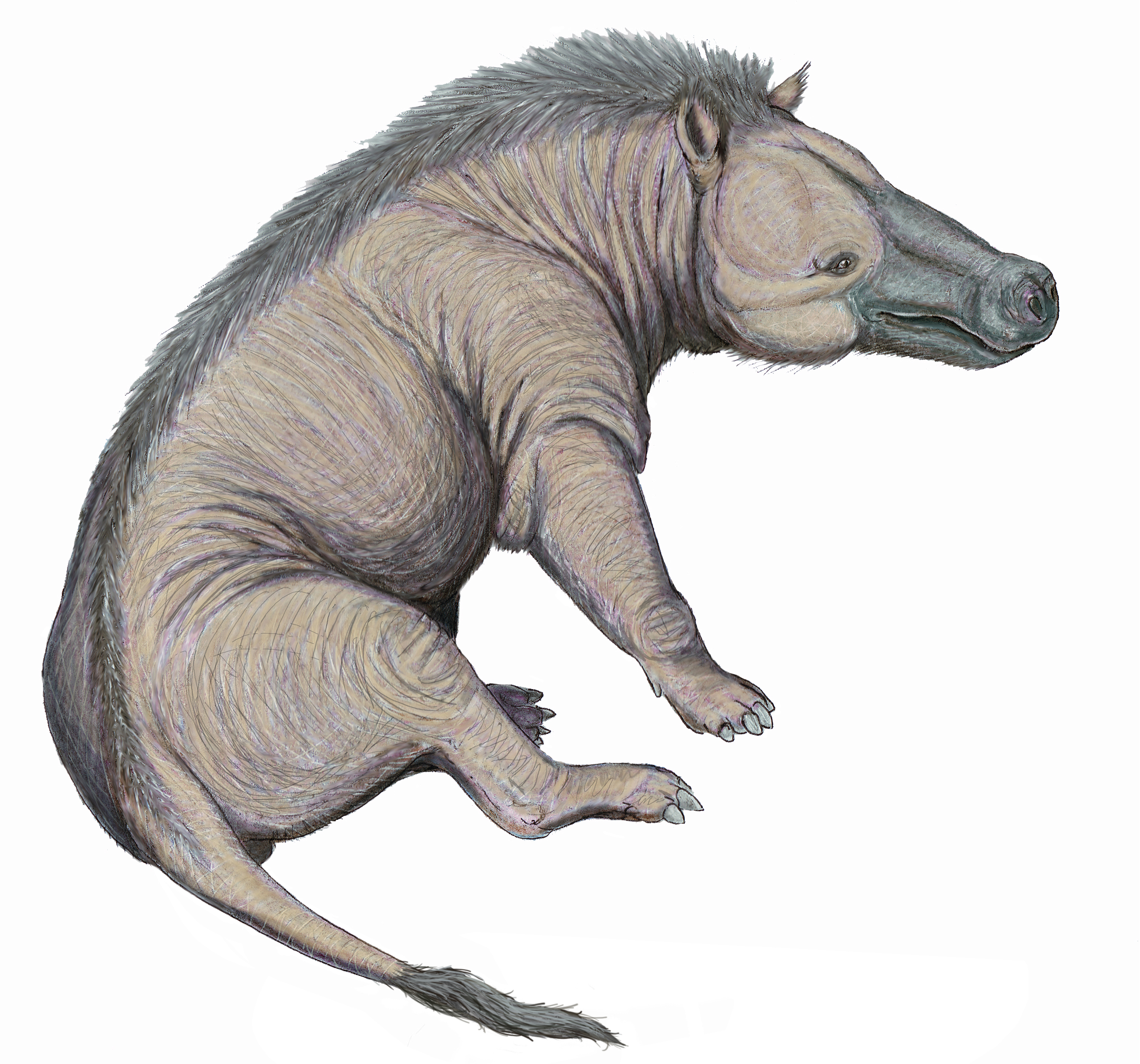
Reconstruction of Andrewsarchus, an omnivorous or carnivorous artiodactyl

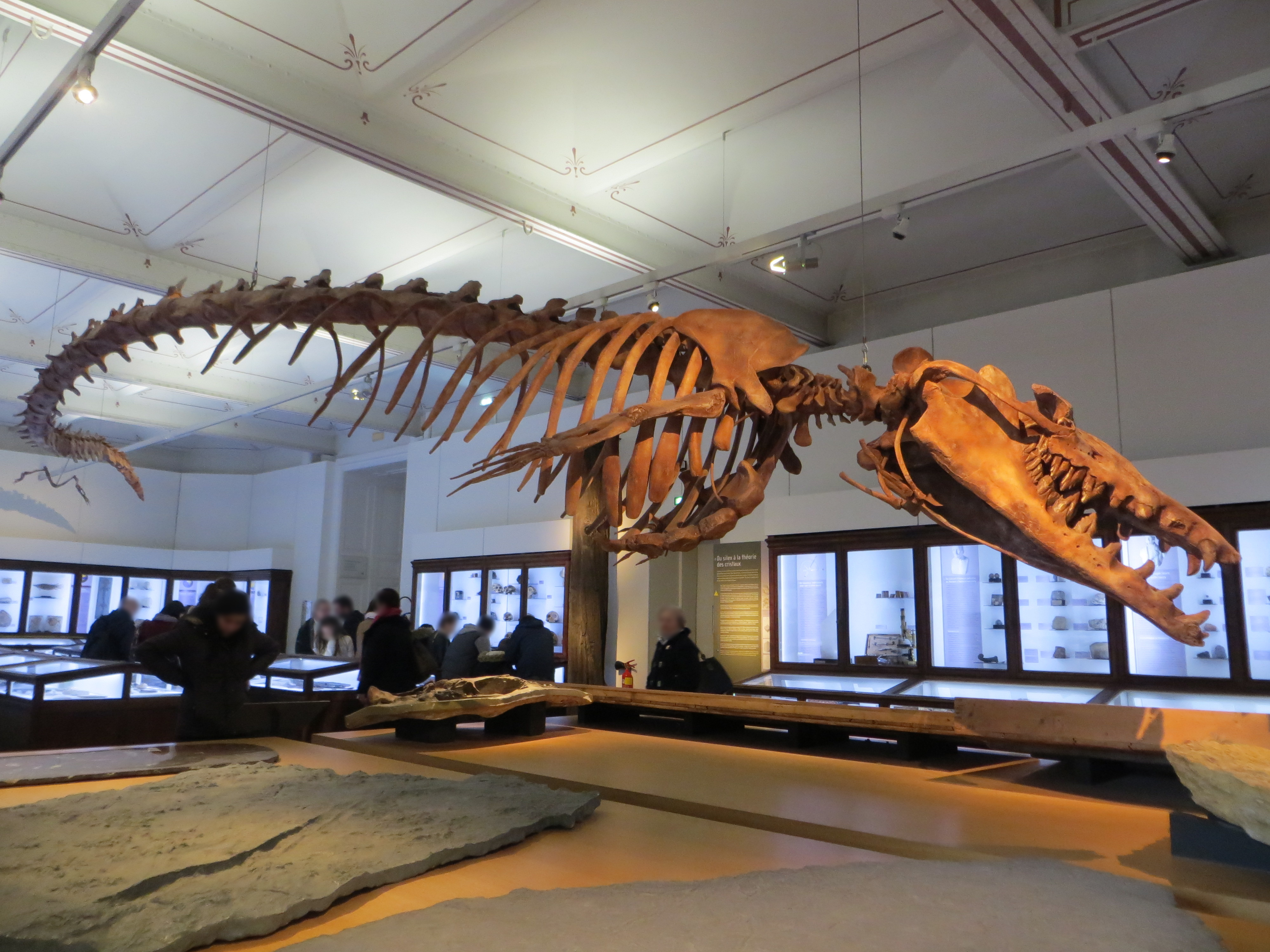
Basilosaurus, an early whale (archaeocete)

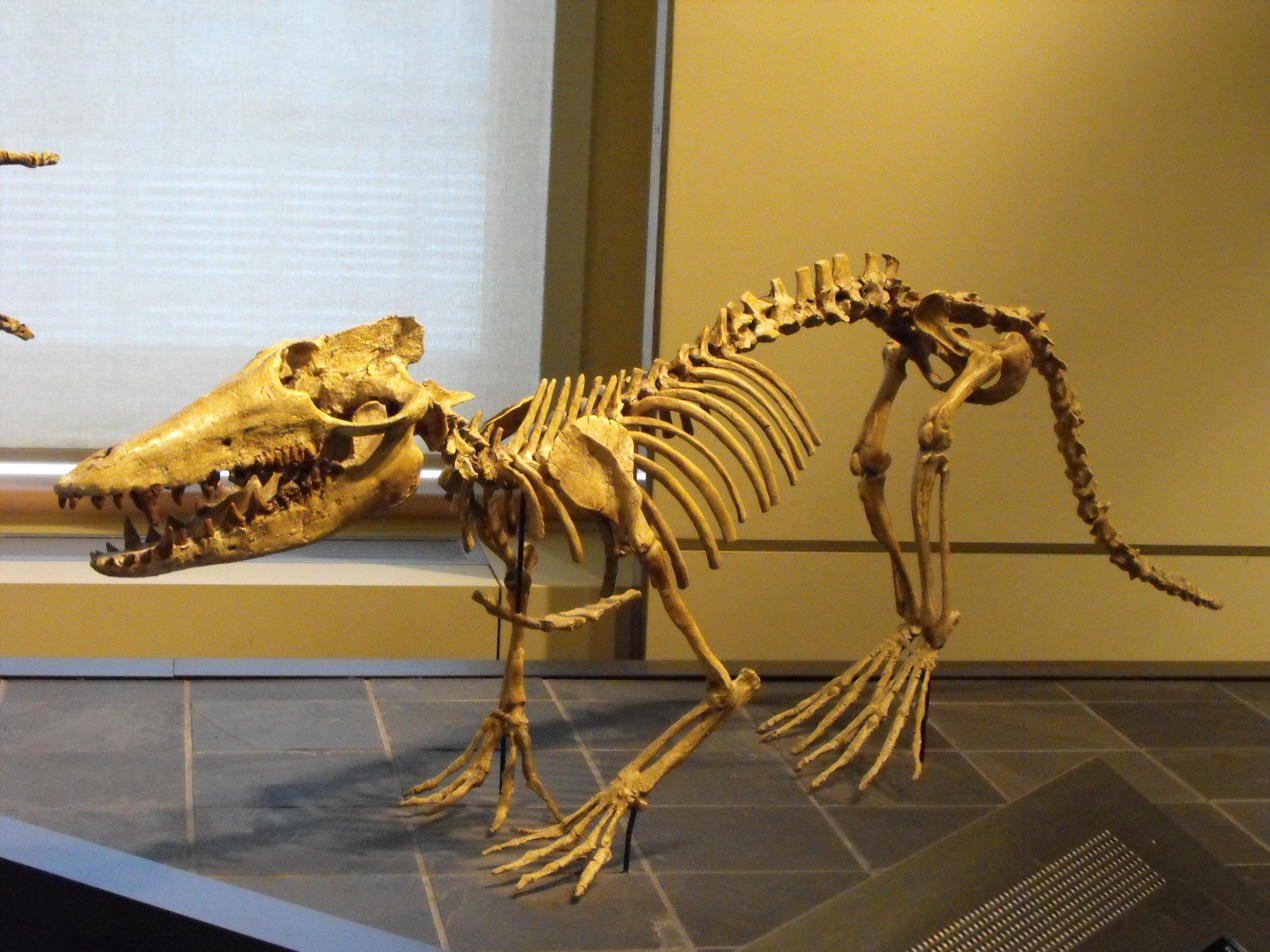
Pakicetus, an amphibious cetacean

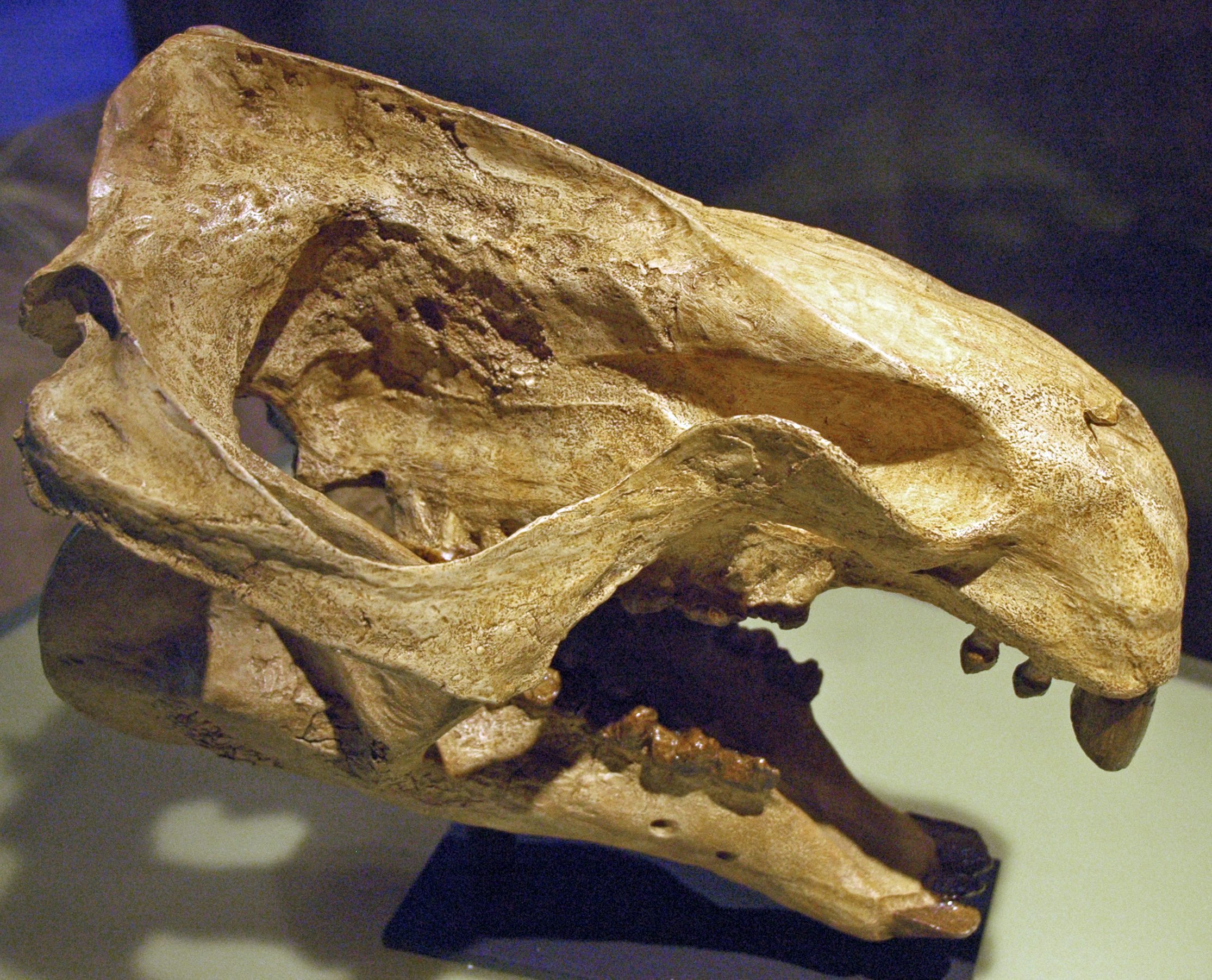
Moeritherium, a basal proboscidean

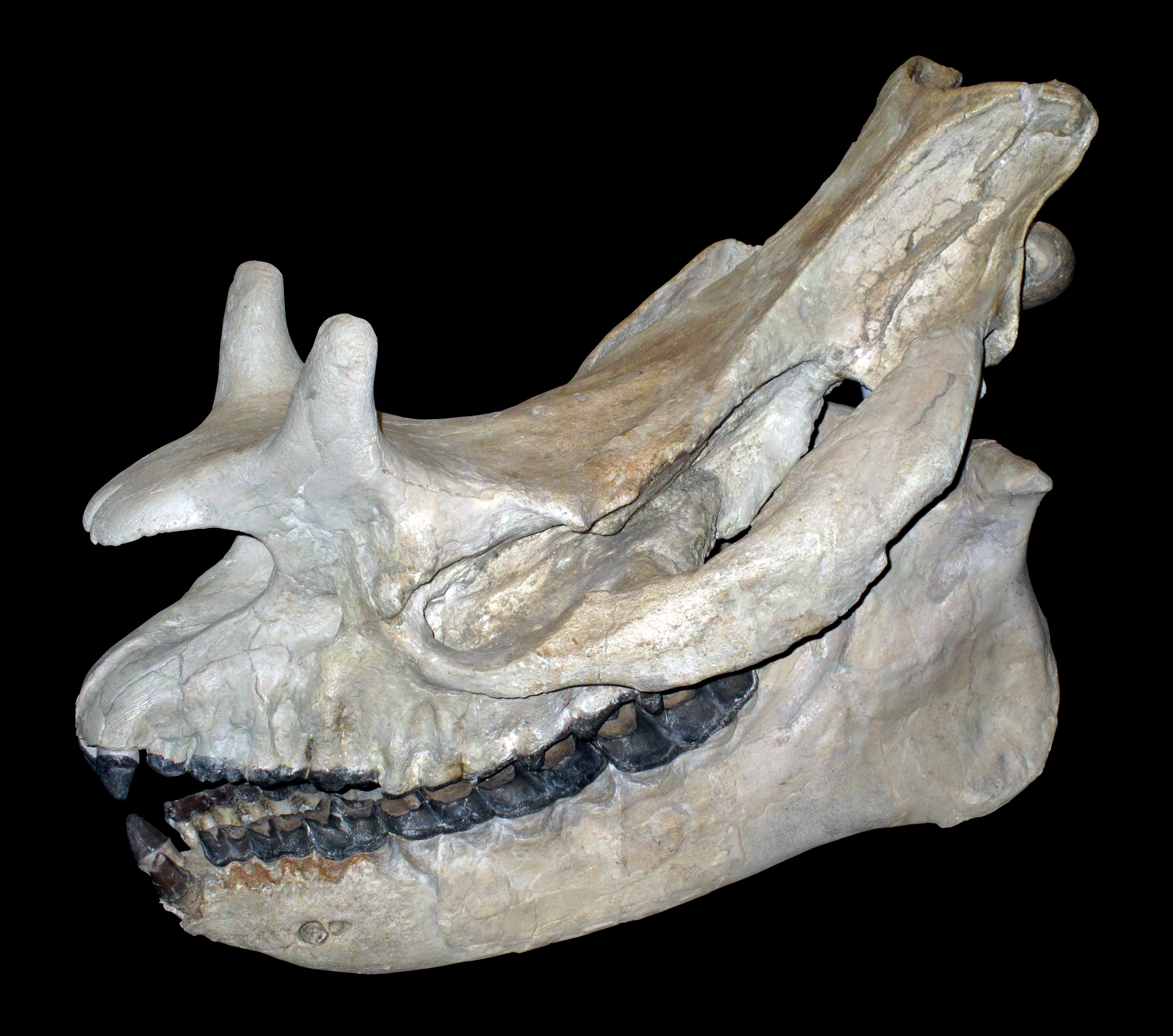
Megacerops, a brontothere

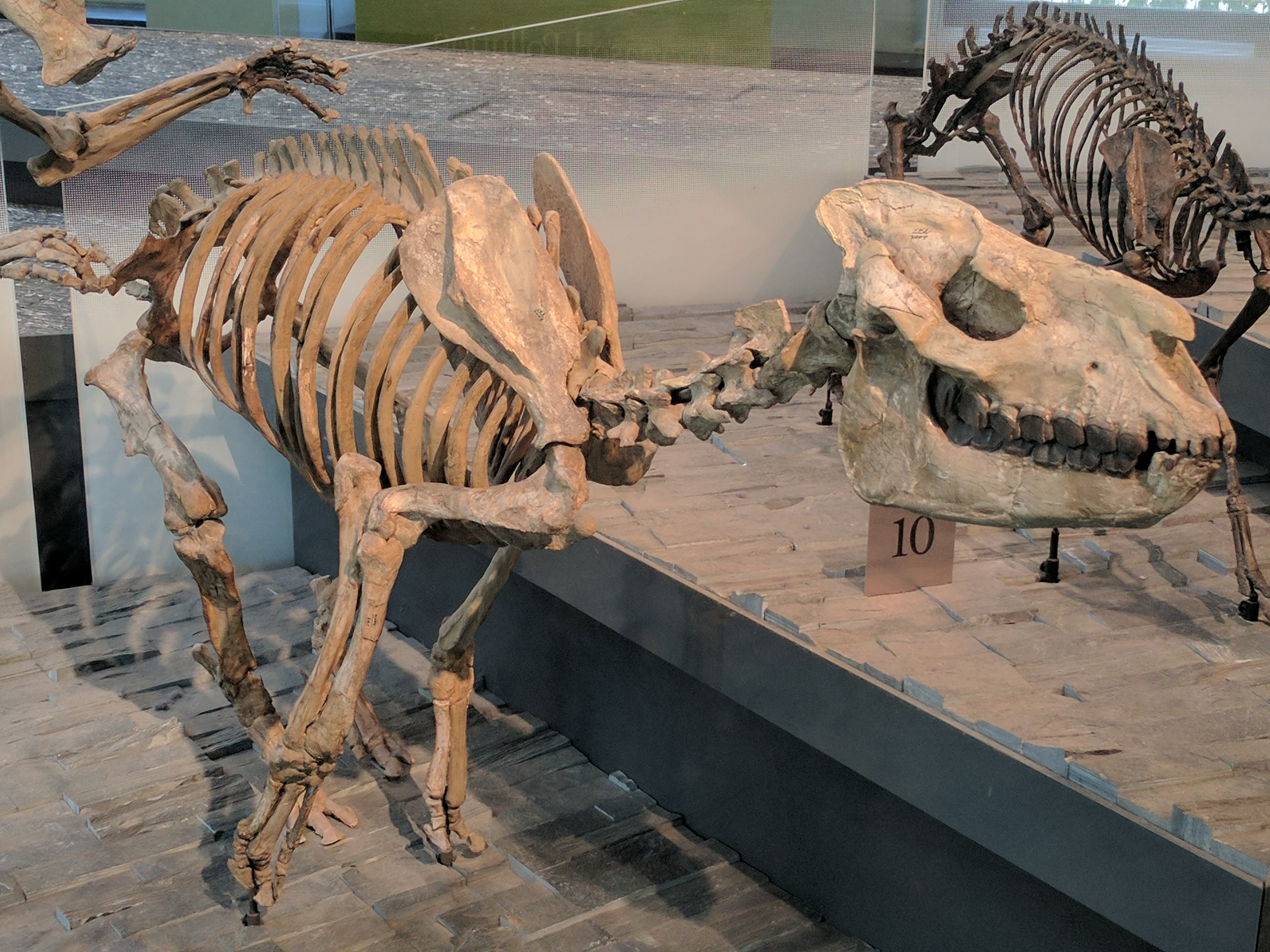
Hyracodon, a hyracodont

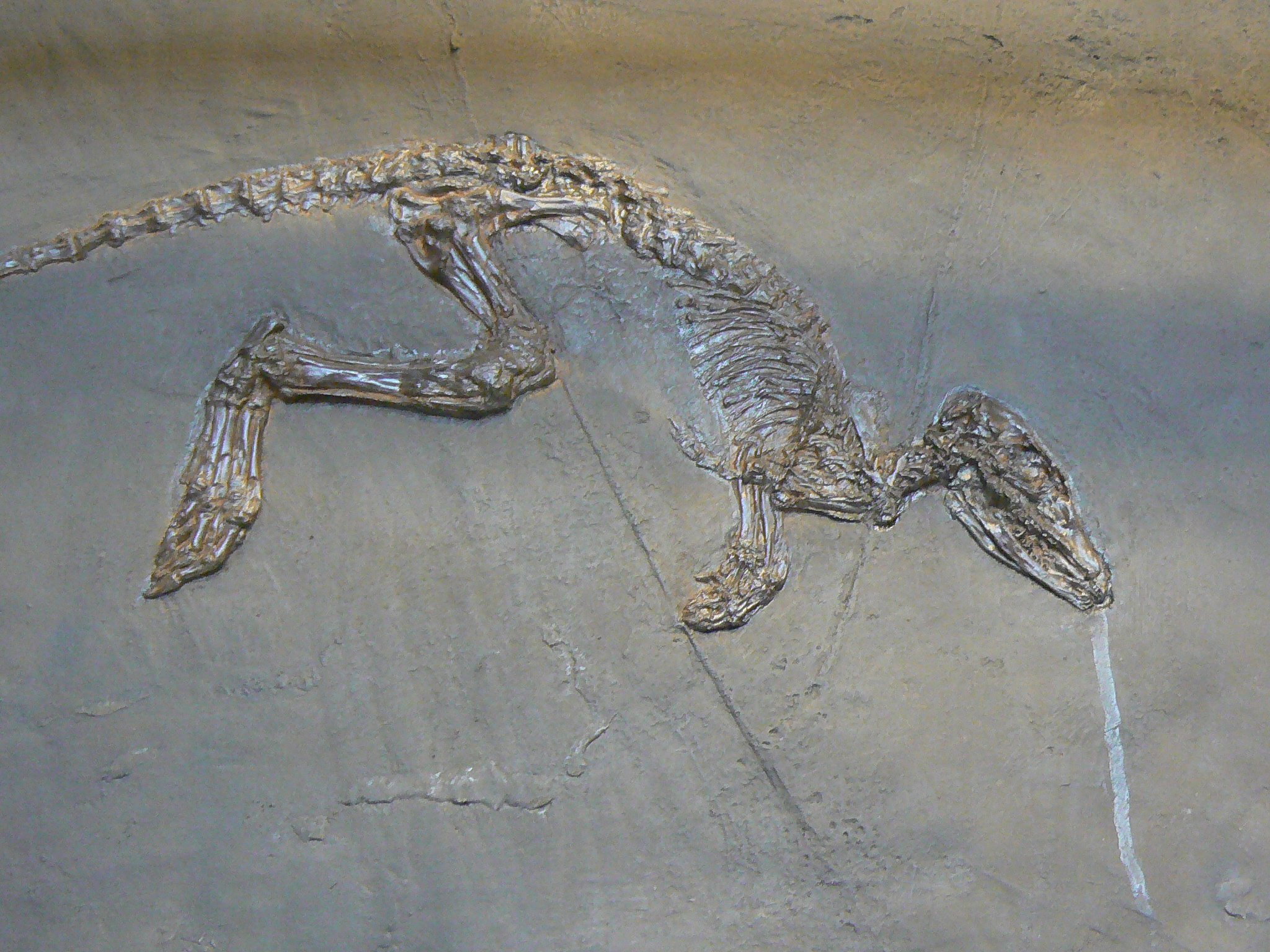
Leptictidium, a small mammal, likely bipedal

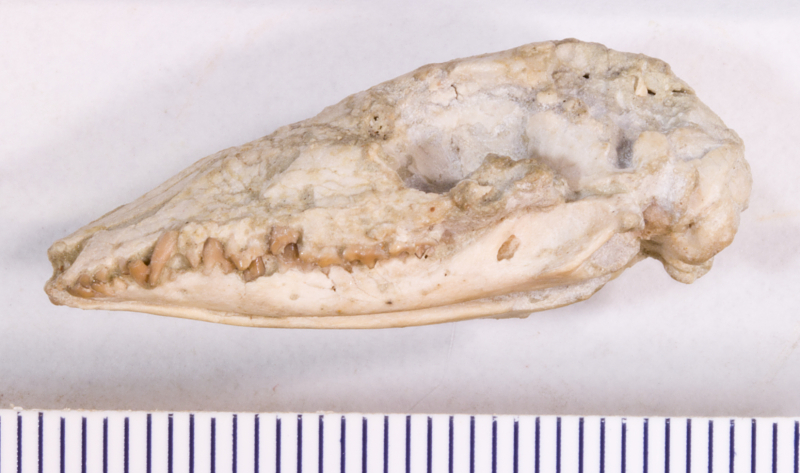
Peratherium, a herpetothere

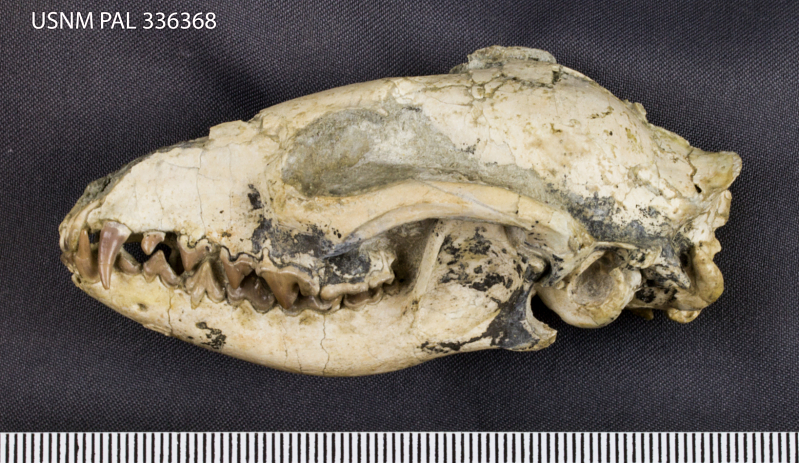
Hesperocyon, a canid

==== Land mammal ages ====
Cenozoic mammal faunas are often described using biochronological or biostratigraphic systems, which arrange rock strata or intervals of time based on distinctive fossil assemblages or the evolution of new mammal species. Apart from Australia and Antarctica (which have few identifiable Eocene mammal fossils), each continent has a unique series of Cenozoic land mammal ages (LMAs) overprinted on the global geological time scale. These different land mammal ages are listed in the following table, which shows rough correlations to each other and the four global ages/stages of the Eocene:

| Global age | NALMA (North America) | SALMA (South America) | ELMA / MP (Europe) | ALMA (Asia) | AFLMA (Africa) |
|---|---|---|---|---|---|
| Priabonian | Chadronian | Tinguirirican (?) | Headonian (MP 17–20) | Ergilian | Phiomian |
| Priabonian | Chadronian | Divisaderan (?) | Headonian (MP 17–20) | Ergilian | Phiomian |
| Priabonian | Chadronian | Mustersan | Headonian (MP 17–20) | Ulangochuian | Phiomian |
| Bartonian | Duchesnean | Mustersan | Robiacian (MP 14–16) | Ulangochuian | Kebarian |
| Bartonian | Duchesnean | Casamayoran (Vacan + Barrancan) | Robiacian (MP 14–16) | Sharamurunian | Kebarian |
| Bartonian | Uintan | Casamayoran (Vacan + Barrancan) | Robiacian (MP 14–16) | Sharamurunian | Lazibian |
| Lutetian | Uintan | Casamayoran (Vacan + Barrancan) | Robiacian (MP 14–16) | Sharamurunian | Lazibian |
| Lutetian | Uintan | Casamayoran (Vacan + Barrancan) | Geiseltalian (MP 11–13) | Irdinmanhan | Lazibian |
| Lutetian | Bridgerian | Casamayoran (Vacan + Barrancan) | Geiseltalian (MP 11–13) | Arshantan | Lazibian |
| Ypresian | Bridgerian | Riochican | Grauvian (MP 10) | Arshantan | Abdounian |
| Ypresian | Wasatchian | Itaboraian | Neustrian (MP 7–9) | Bumbanian | Abdounian |

==== Birds ====
Eocene birds include some enigmatic groups with resemblances to modern forms, some of which continued from the Paleocene. Bird taxa of the Eocene include carnivorous psittaciforms, such as Messelasturidae, Halcyornithidae, large flightless forms such as Gastornis and Eleutherornis, the long-legged falcon Masillaraptor, ancient galliforms such as Gallinuloides, putative rail relatives of the family Songziidae, various pseudotooth birds such as Gigantornis, the ibis relative Rhynchaeites, primitive swifts of the genus Aegialornis, and primitive penguins such as Archaeospheniscus and Inkayacu.

Many Eocene birds in Central Europe evolved tuberculate vertebrae as an adaptation against predation, with flightless birds facing low predation pressure during this time as a result.

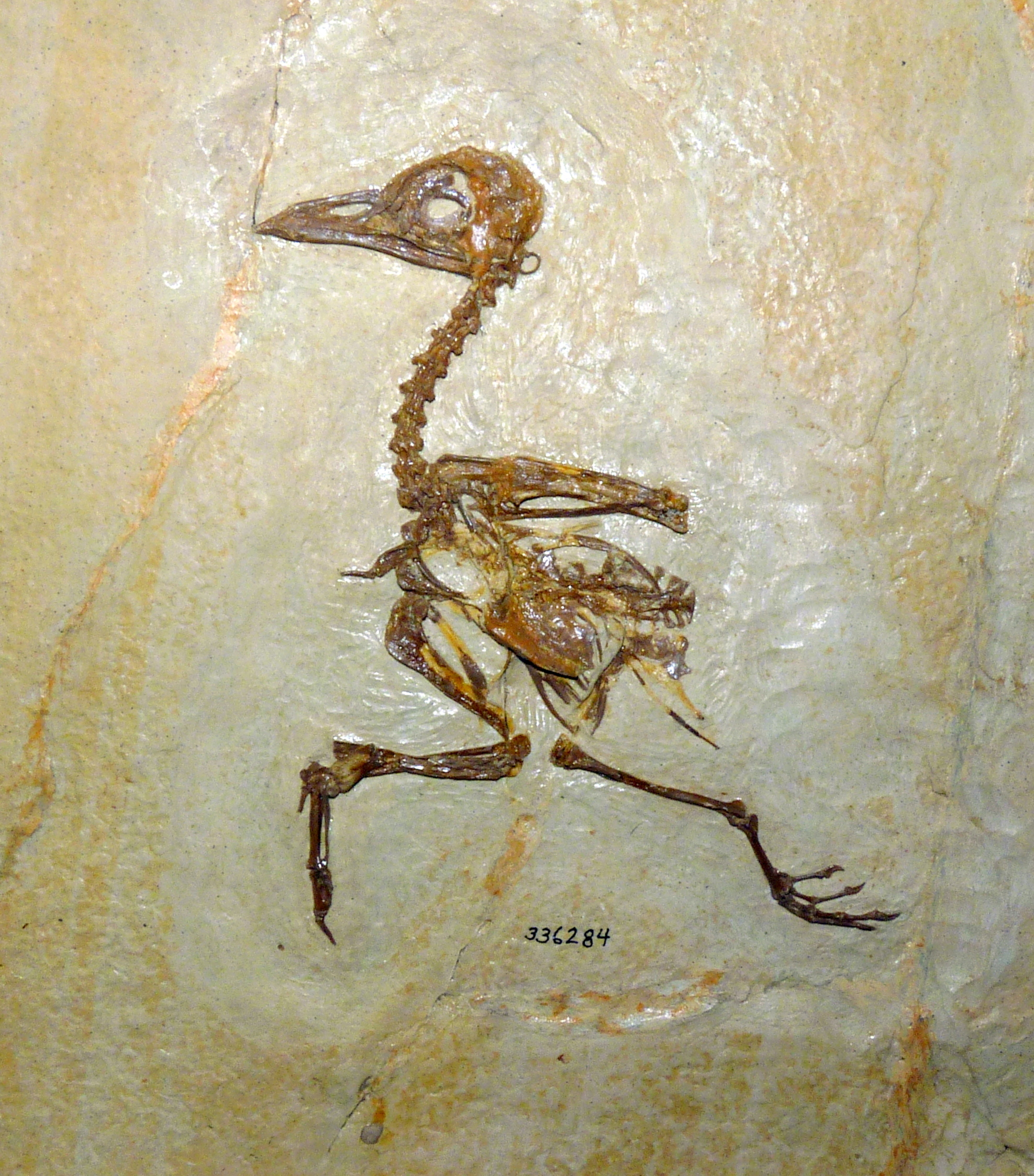
Primobucco, an early relative of the roller

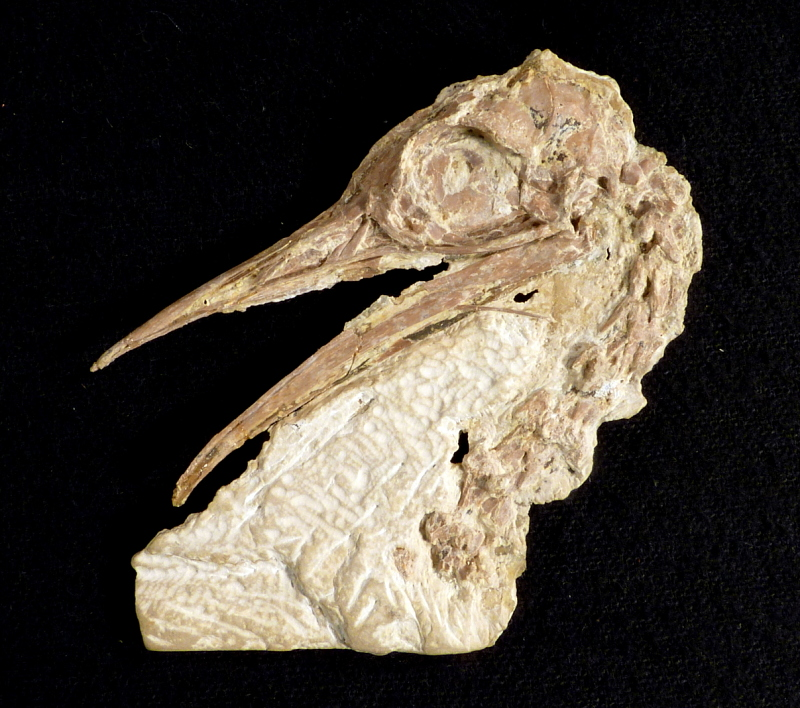
Pseudocrypturus, Early Eocene, Wyoming

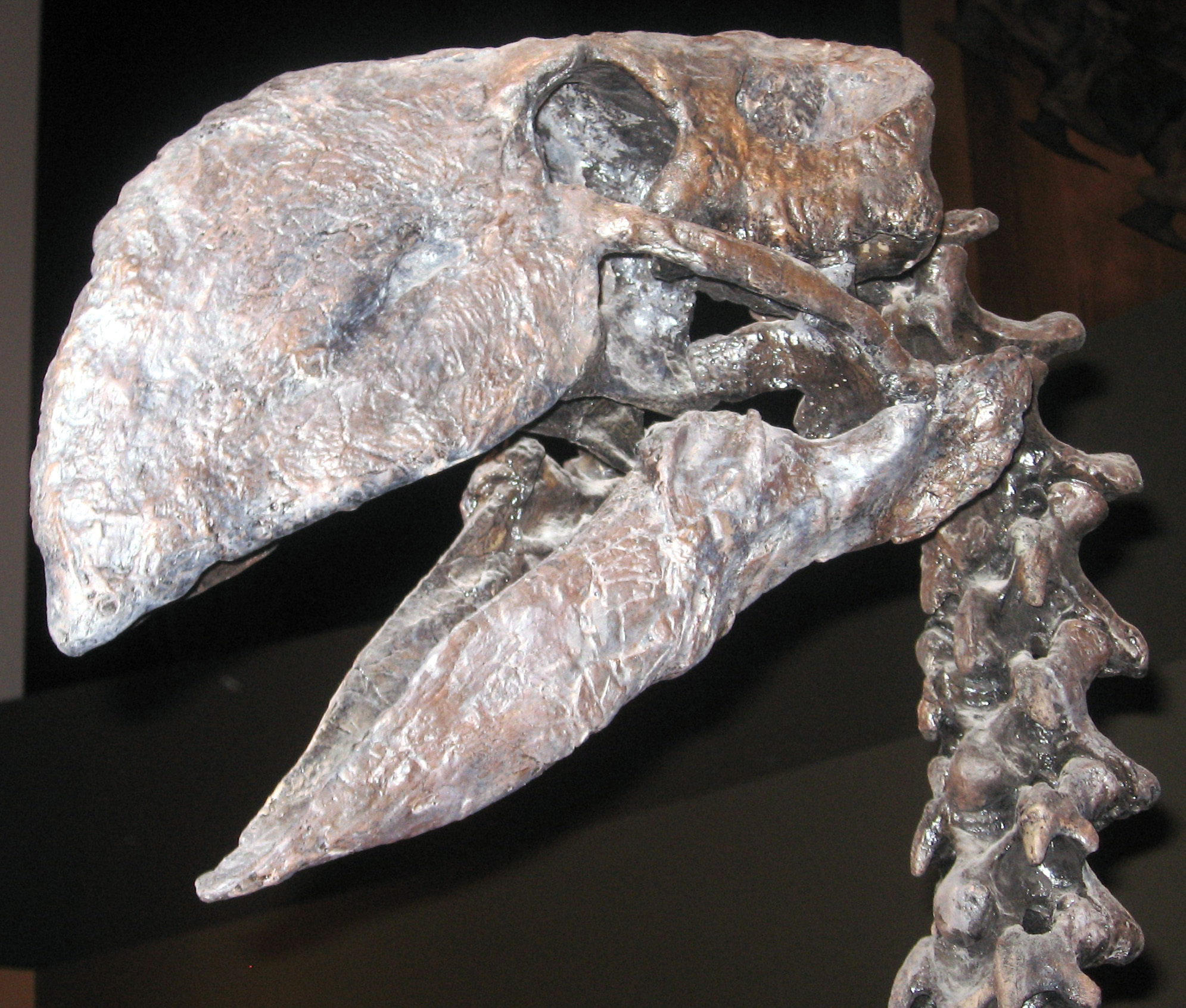
Gastornis, a flightless bird

==== Fishes ====
Fishes, both Chondrichthyes such as sharks and rays, and Osteichthyes (bony fishes), are abundant in the London Clay.

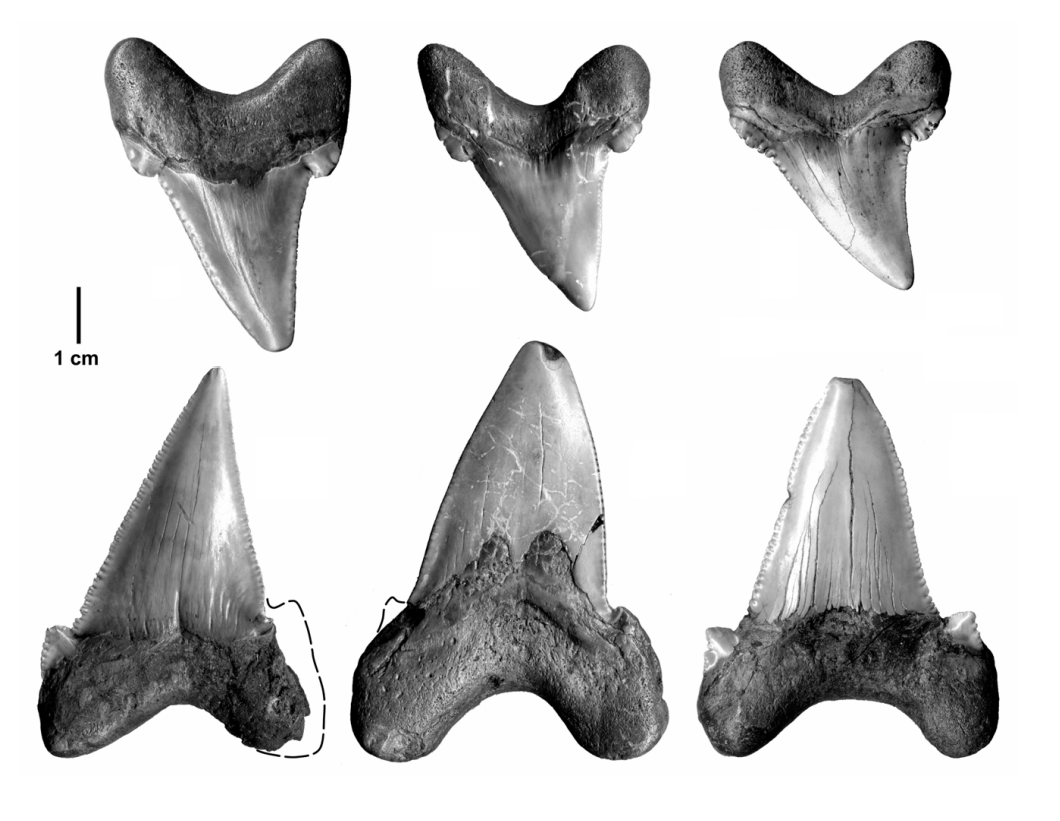
Teeth of Otodus sokolovi, an otodontid shark

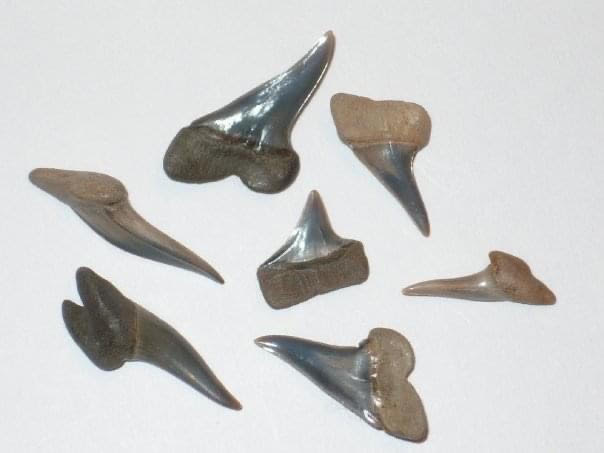
Teeth of Xiphodolamia. a mackerel shark, London Clay

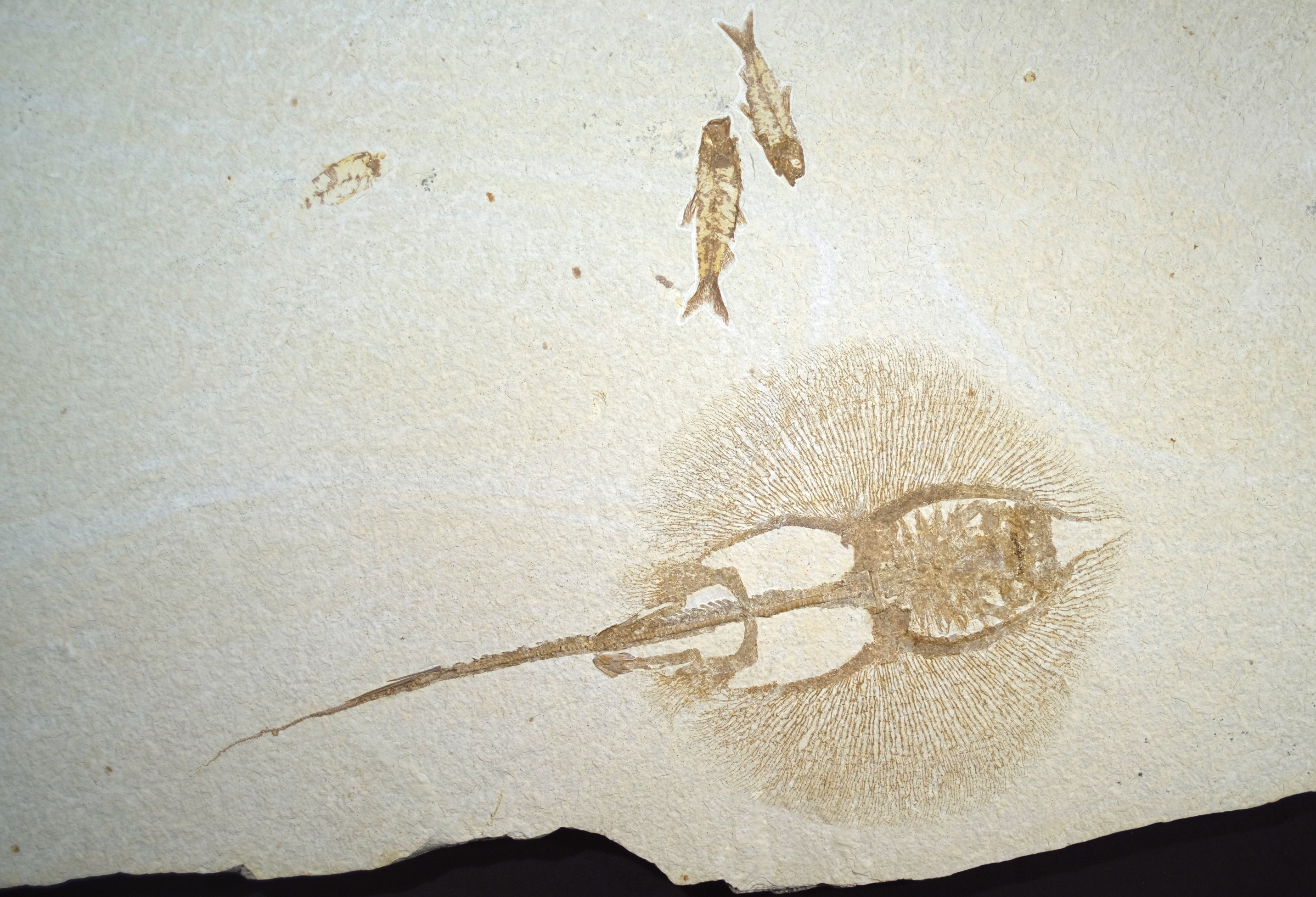
Heliobatis and Knightia

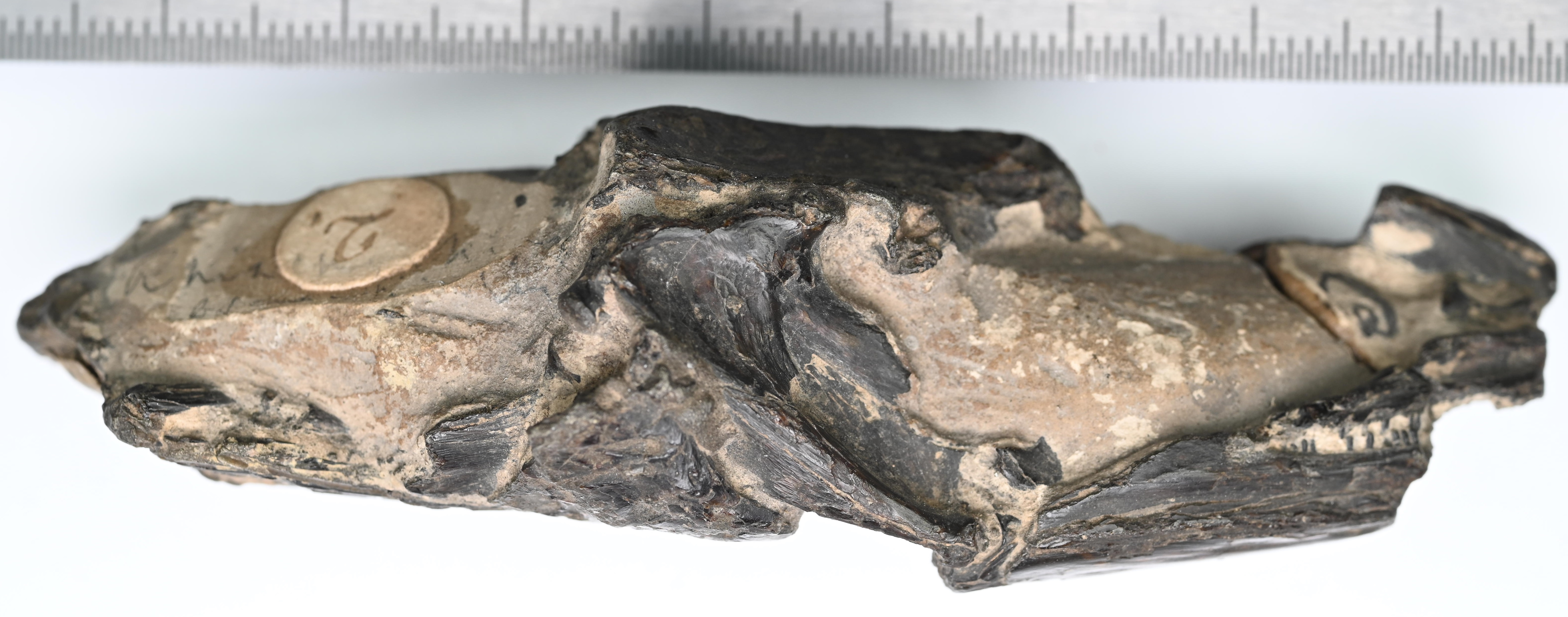
Eel, cf. Echelus branchialis, collected by Louis Agassiz

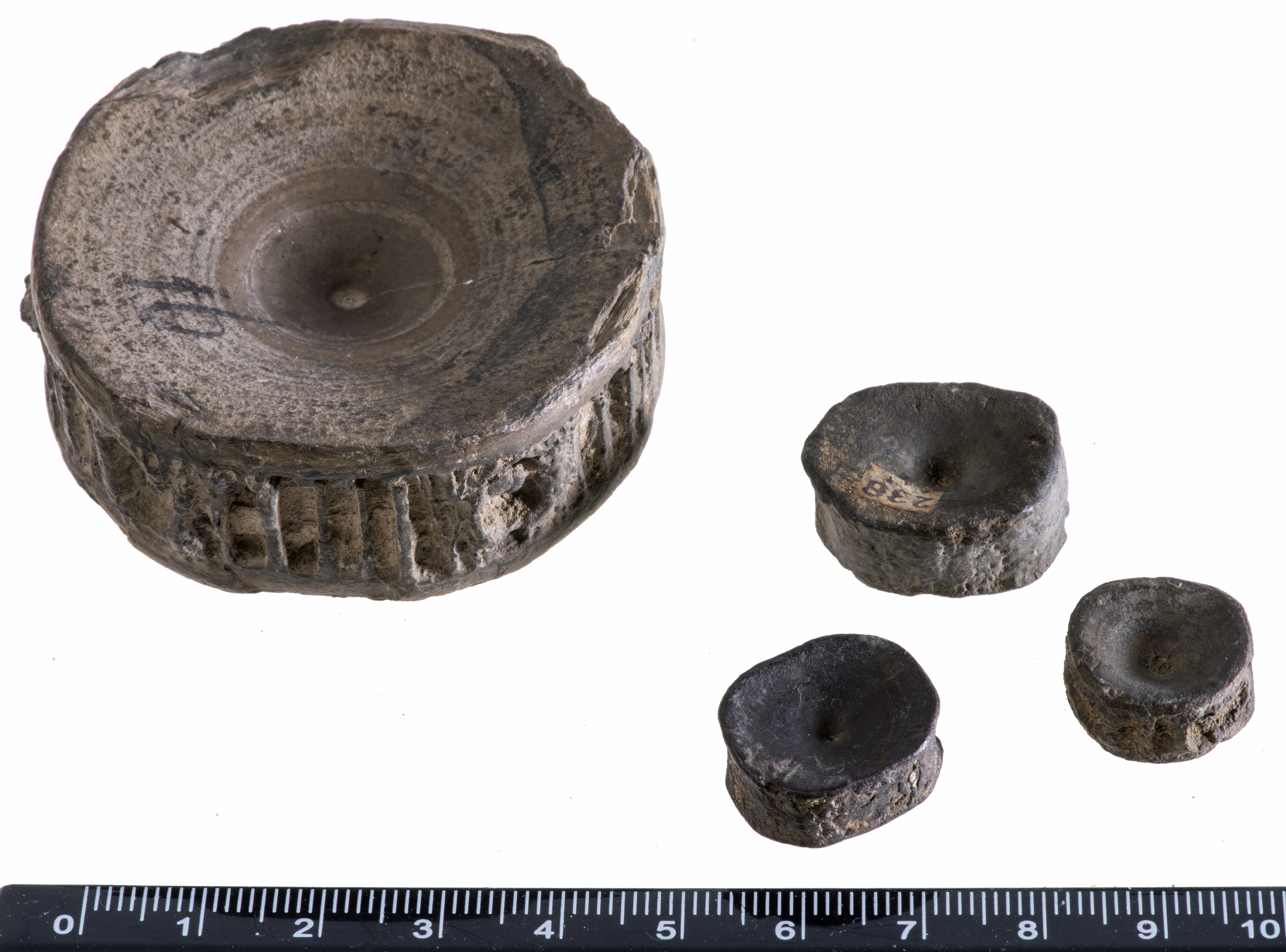
Vertebrae of a lamniform shark, London Clay, Isle of Sheppey

==== Reptiles ====
Reptile fossils from this time, such as fossils of pythons and turtles, are abundant.

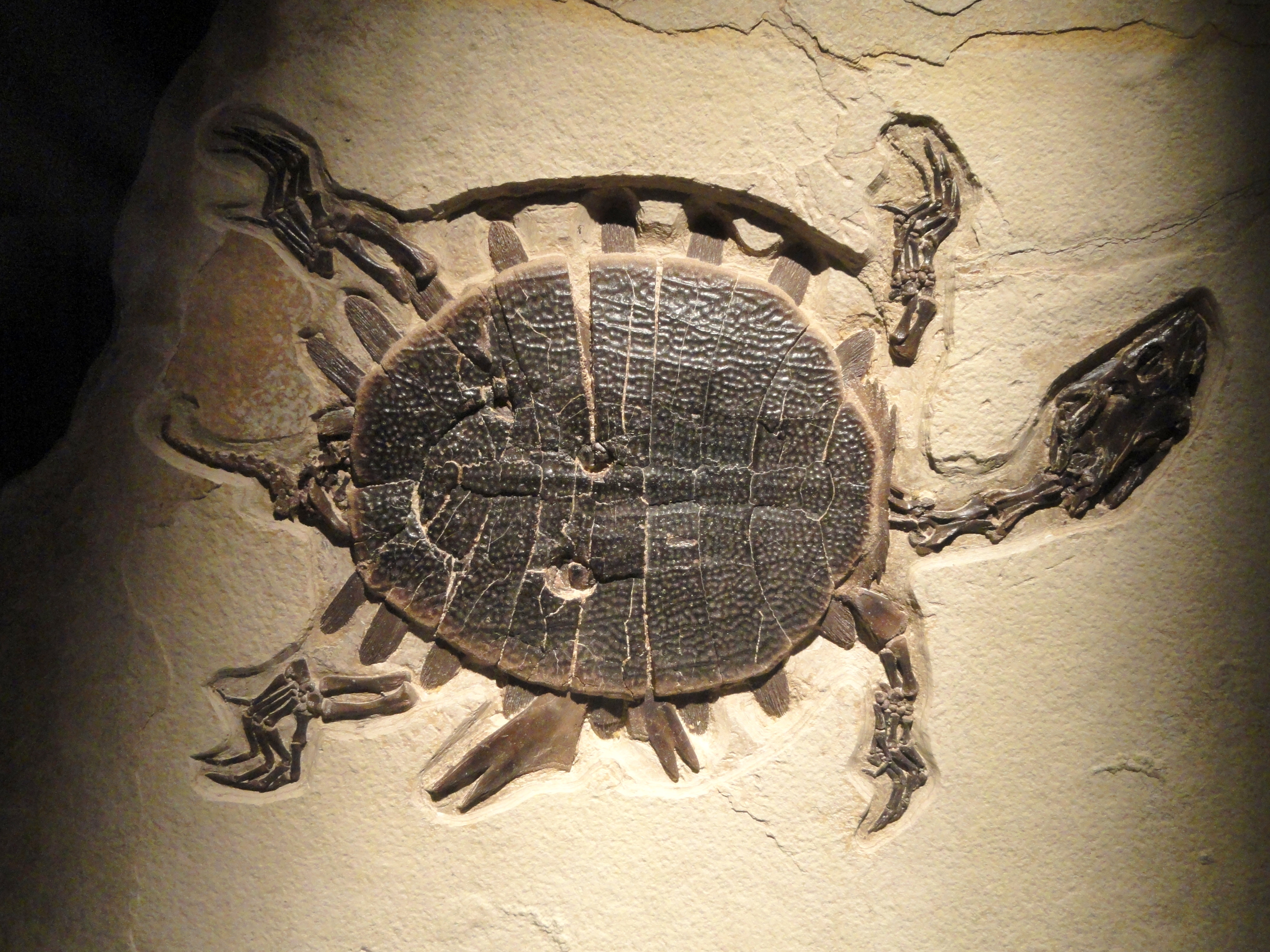
Hummelichelys with crocodile bite marks

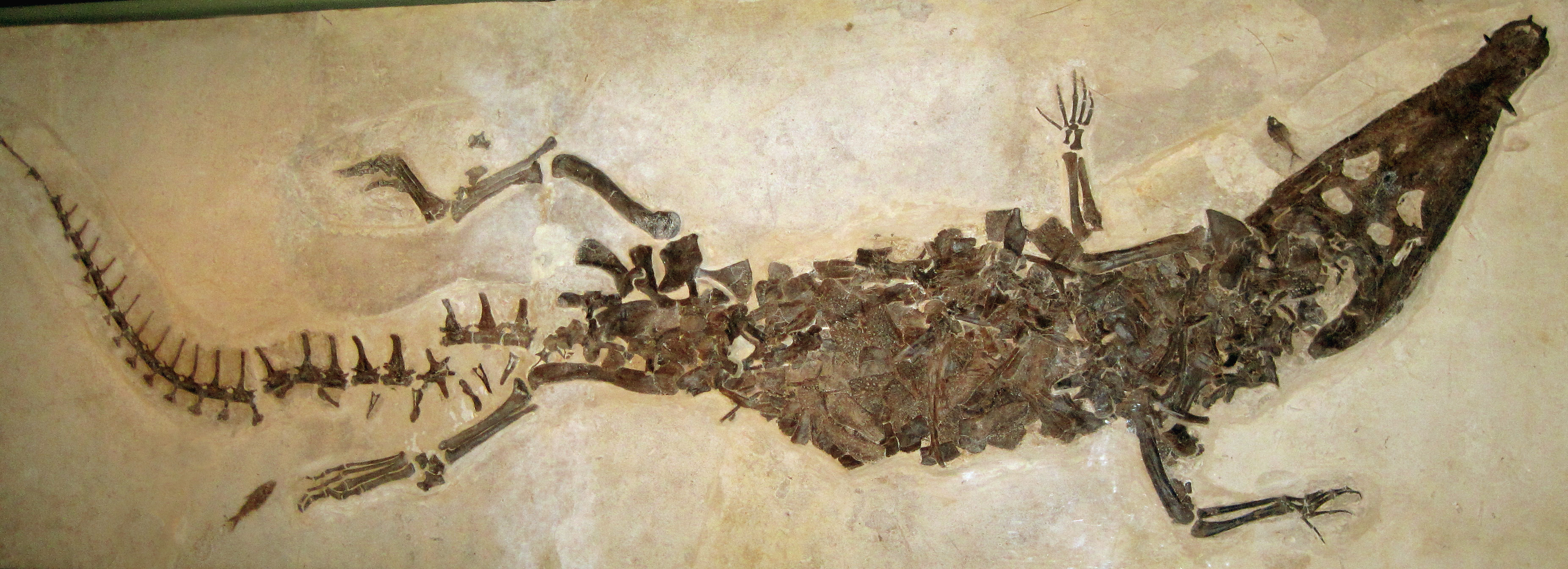
Borealosuchus, a crocodyliform

=== Molluscs ===
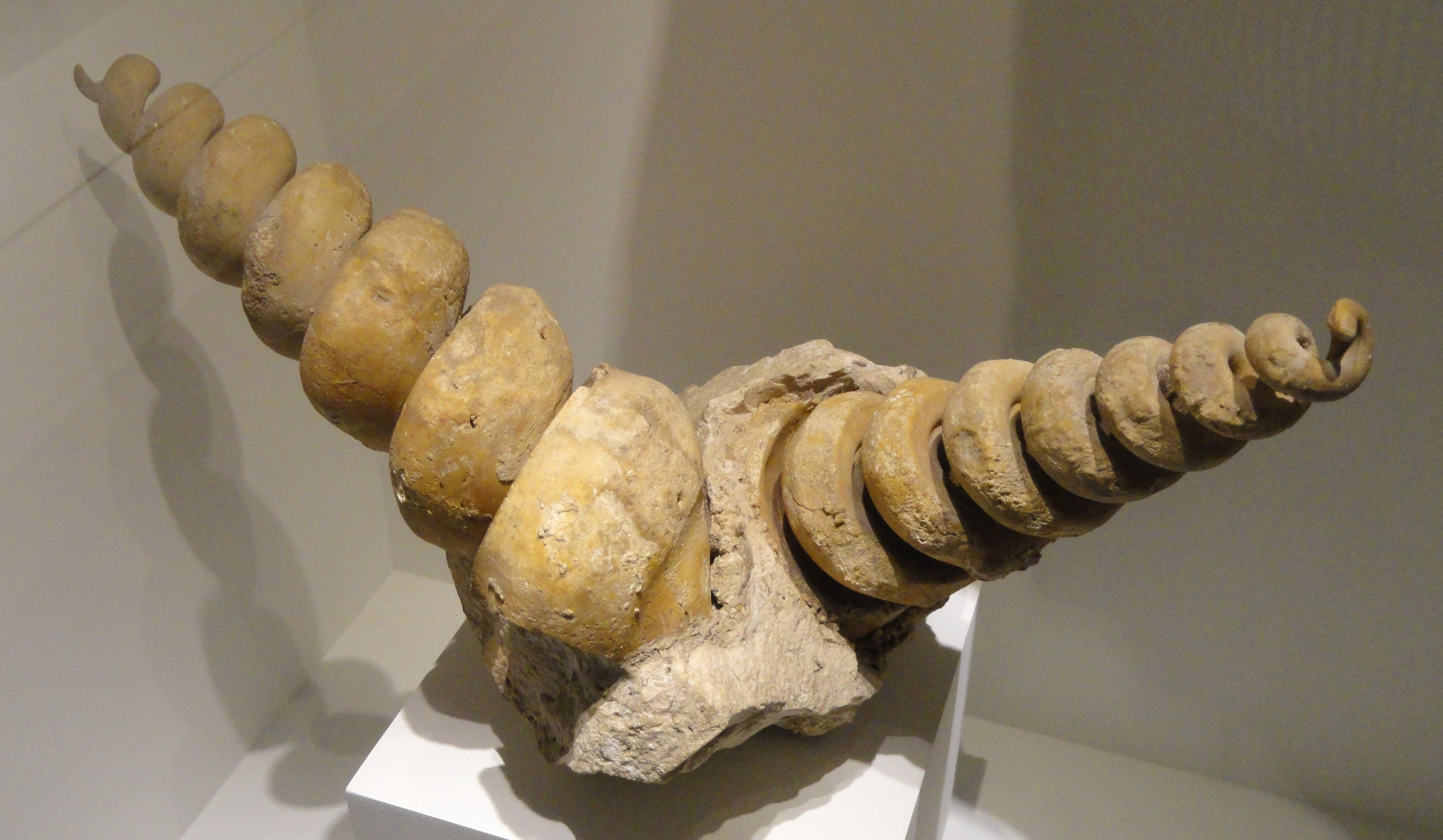
Cerithium shells

=== Arthropods ===
Several rich fossil insect faunas are known from the Eocene, notably the Baltic amber found mainly along the south coast of the Baltic Sea, amber from the Paris Basin, France, the Fur Formation, Denmark, and the Bembridge Marls from the Isle of Wight, England. Insects found in Eocene deposits mostly belong to genera that exist today, though their range has often shifted since the Eocene. For instance the bibionid genus Plecia is common in fossil faunas from presently temperate areas, but only lives in the tropics and subtropics today. Platypleurin cicadas diversified during the Eocene. Ostracods flourished in the oceans.

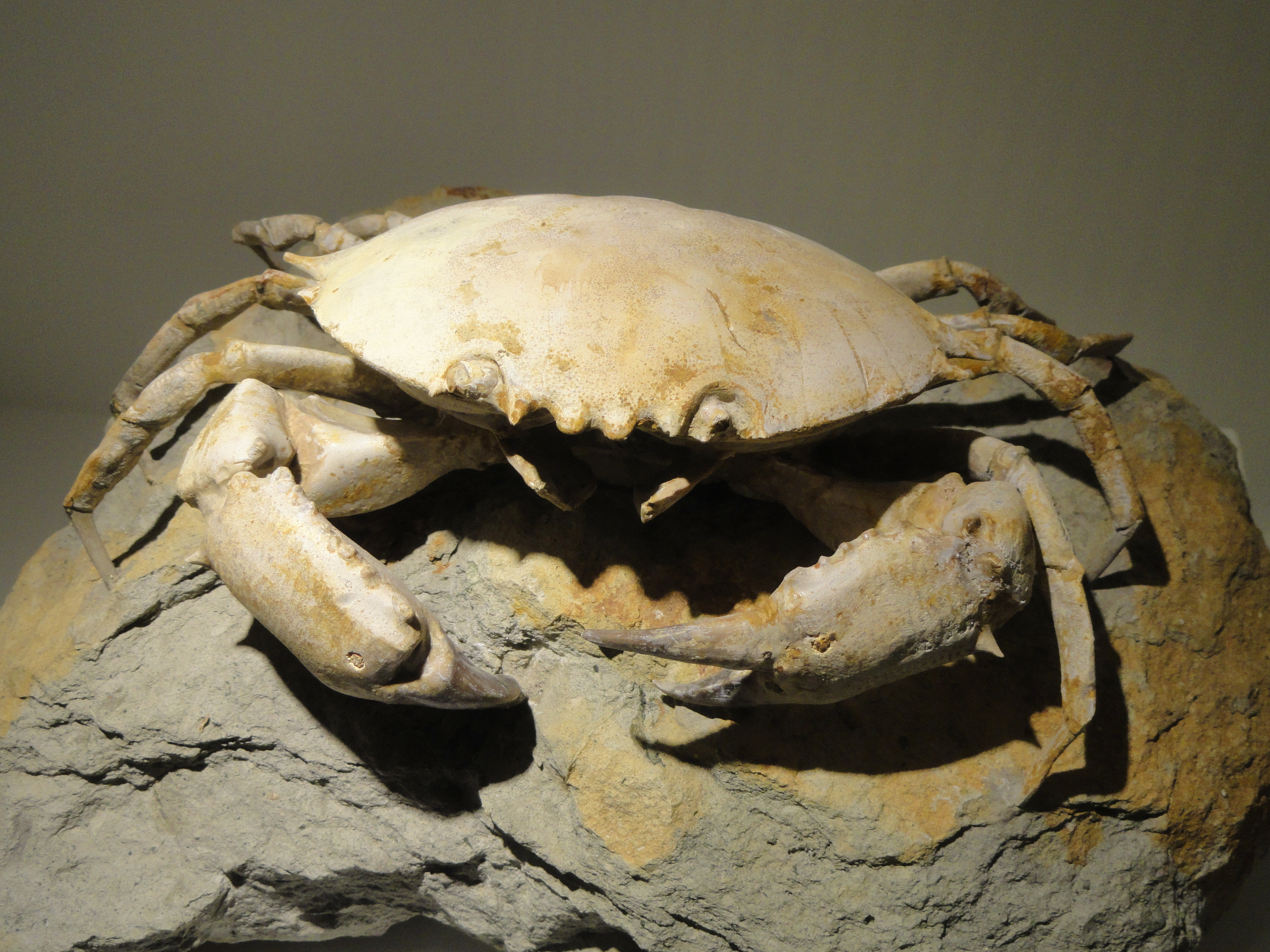
Harpactocarcinus, a crab

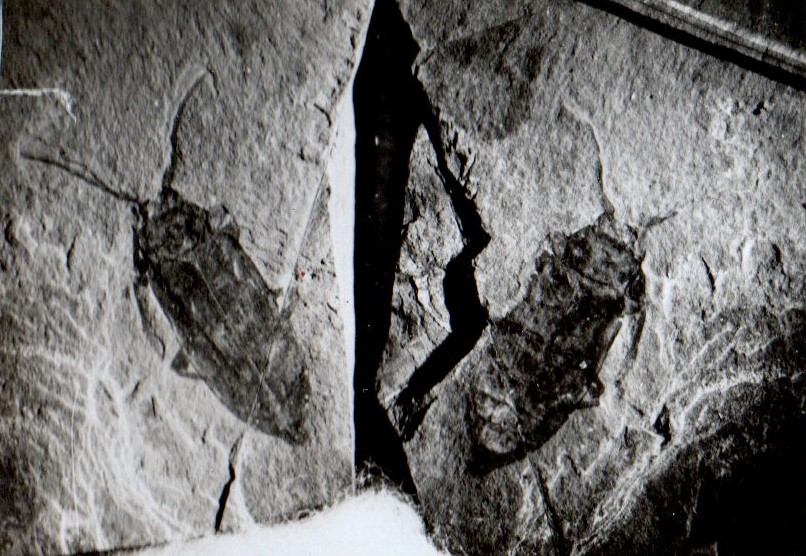
Palaeoncoderes, a beetle

=== Other phyla ===
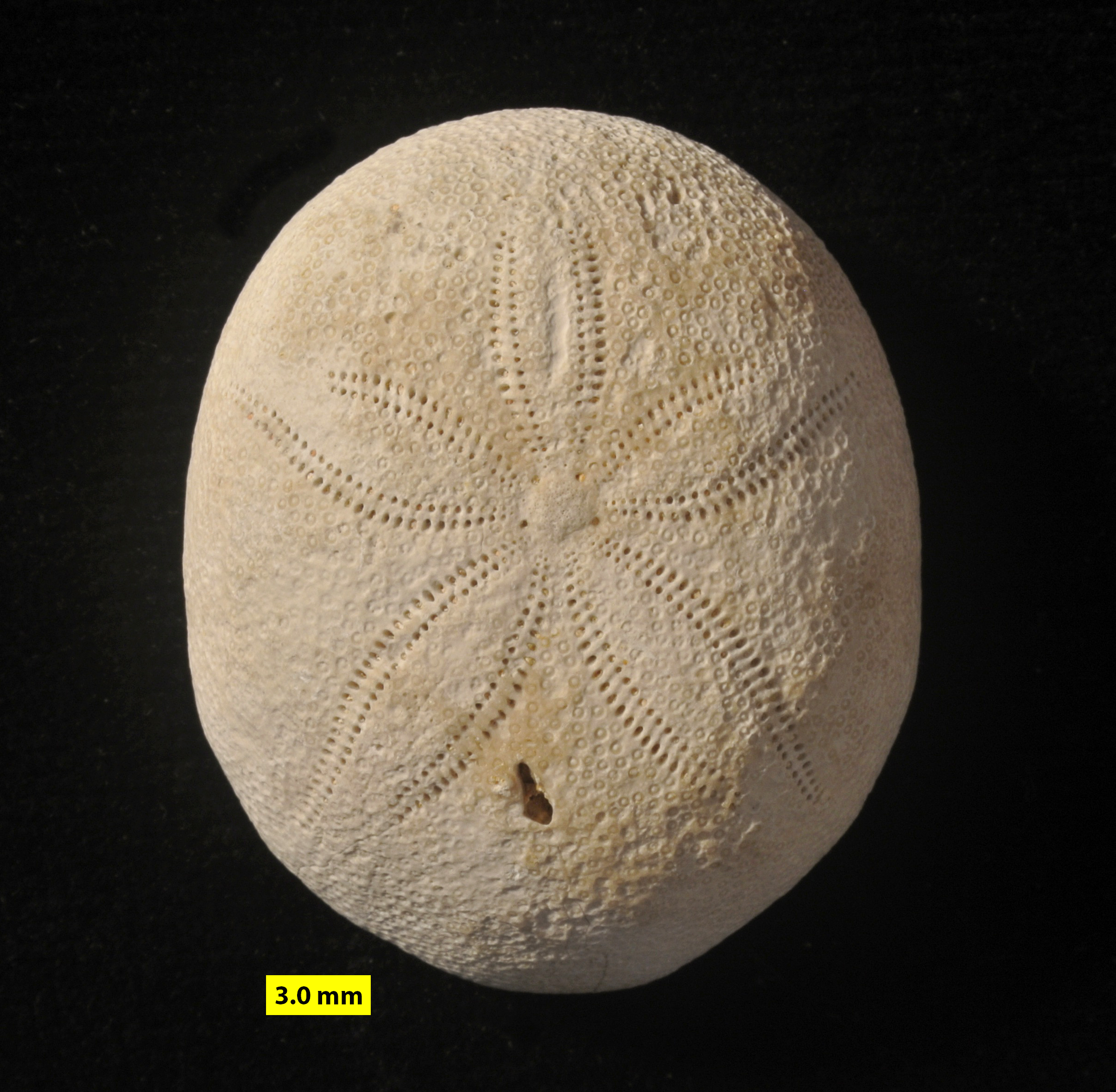
Echinolampas, a sea urchin

=== Microbes ===
Calcareous nannoplankton were a prominent feature of Eocene marine ecosystems.

== See also ==
- Bolca in Italy
- List of fossil sites (with link directory)
- London Clay
- Messel pit in Germany
- Wadi El Hitan in Egypt
