= Brian John Marples =

New Zealand zoologist (1907–1997)

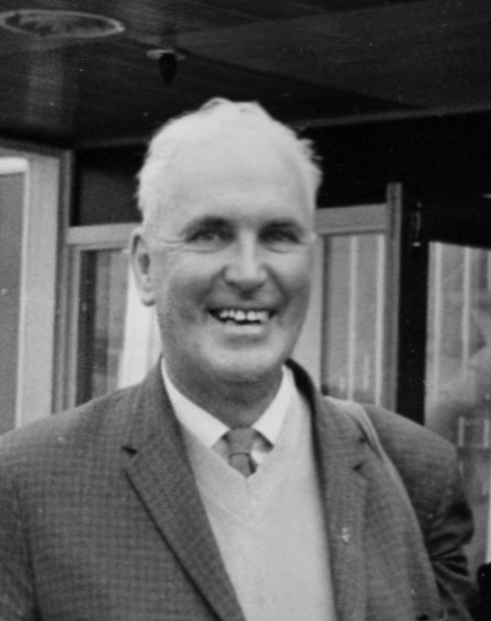
Brian John Marples in 1967

Brian John Marples FRSNZ (31 March 1907 – 1997) was a British zoologist who spent most of his career in New Zealand.

== Early life ==
Marples was born in Hessle, Yorkshire, in north-eastern England. His parents were Annie and George Marples. His father was a teacher of art, and he had an older brother, Morris Marples.

He was educated at Kingsmead in Cheshire, and St Bees in Cumberland before attending Exeter College, Oxford. He graduated BA from Oxford in 1929, subsequently obtaining a MSc degree from the University of Manchester in 1931, and his Oxford degree was promoted to MA in 1933. He married Mary Joyce Ransford in 1931, with whom he later had two sons.

== Career ==
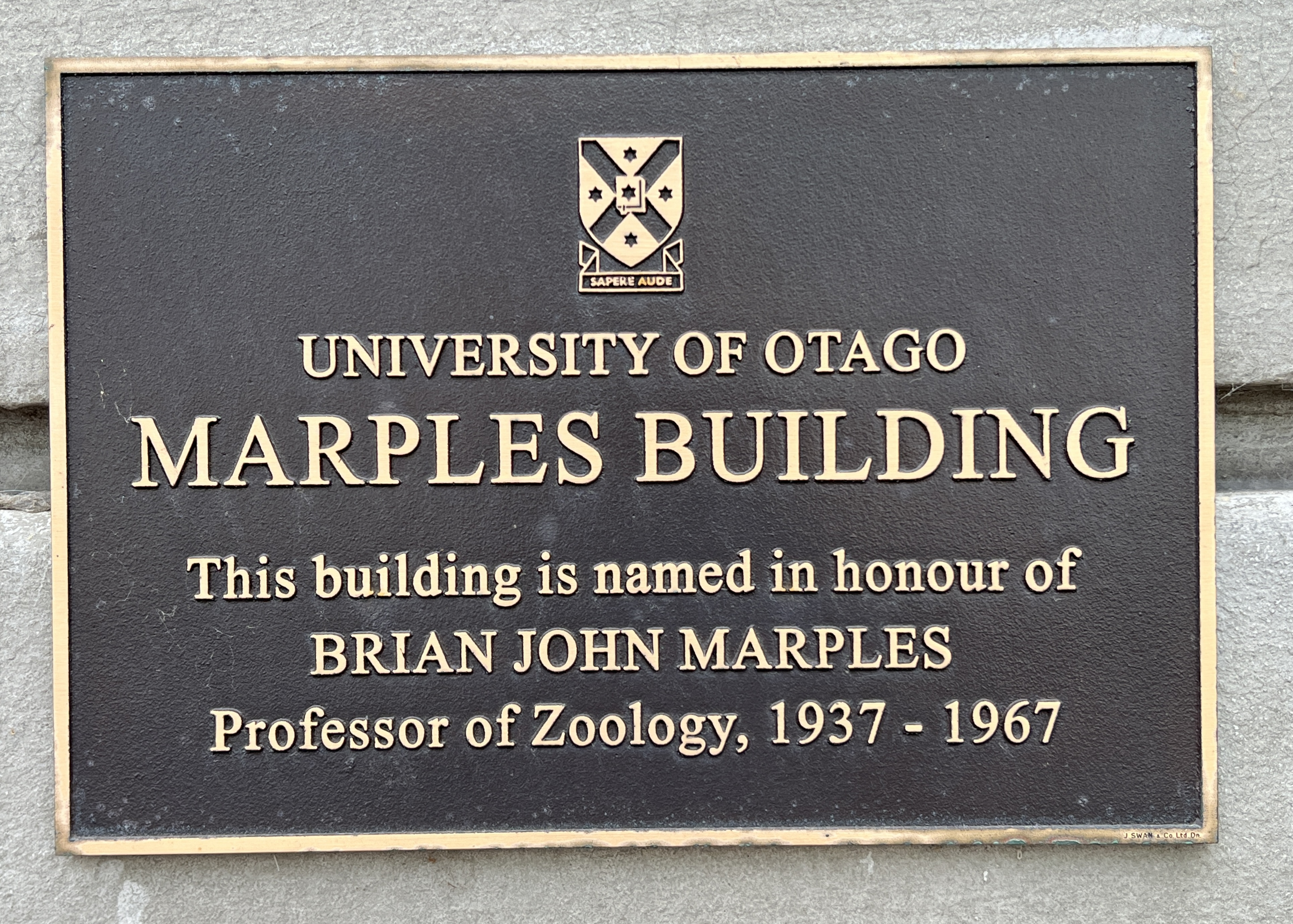
The Zoology Department building at the University of Otago was renamed the Marples Building in honour of Brian Marples

From 1930 to 1936, Marples worked as assistant lecturer in zoology at Manchester. In 1937, he went to New Zealand to become professor of zoology at the University of Otago, a position he served in for 30 years before retiring in 1967 to Woodstock, near Oxford in southern England. He published numerous papers on a wide variety of zoological topics, especially in the fields of ornithology, arachnology, and fossil penguins. He was also a cofounder of the Ornithological Society of New Zealand.

== Honours ==
- 1953 – Fellow, Royal Society of New Zealand
- 1980 – Honorary Member, Ornithological Society of New Zealand
