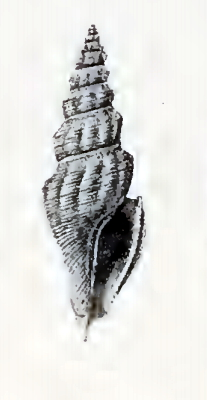
- Brachytoma rioensis

Scientific classification
- Kingdom: Animalia
- Phylum: Mollusca
- Class: Gastropoda
- Subclass: Caenogastropoda
- Order: Neogastropoda
- Superfamily: Conoidea
- Family: Pseudomelatomidae
- Genus: Brachytoma; Swainson, 1840

Type species
- Pleurotoma strombiformis G. B. Sowerby II, 1839

Species
- See text

Synonyms
- Clavus (Brachytoma); Drillia (Brachytoma)

= Brachytoma =

Genus of gastropods

Brachytoma is a genus of sea snails, marine gastropod mollusks in the family Pseudomelatomidae.

R.N. Kilburn proposed in 1989 the name Brachytoma to be rejected, since the type species Pleurotoma strombiformis G. B. Sowerby II, 1839 is considered a nomen dubium and there is no valid ground for conferring type status upon it.

== Species ==
Species within the genus Brachytoma include:

- † Brachytoma annandalei Vredenburg, 1921
- † Brachytoma buddhaica Vredenburg, 1921
- † Brachytoma convexa Vredenburg, 1921
- † Brachytoma gautama Vredenburg, 1921
- † Brachytoma pinfoldi Vredenburg, 1921
- † Brachytoma obtusangula (Brocchi, 1814)
- † Brachytoma reticulata Vredenburg, 1921
- Brachytoma rioensis (Smith E. A., 1915)
- Brachytoma rufolineata (Schepman, 1913)
- † Brachytoma sarasvati Vredenburg, 1921
- † Brachytoma simazirianus Nomura & Zinbo, 1936
- Brachytoma stromboides (G. B. Sowerby I, 1832) (nomen dubium)
- † Brachytoma tjemoroensis Martin, 1903
- † Brachytoma yabei Vredenburg, 1921

Species brought into synonymy

- Brachytoma alma Thiele, 1930: synonym of Inquisitor lassulus Hedley, 1922 (junior synonym)
- Brachytoma crenularis Graveley, 1942: synonym of Ptychobela nodulosa (Gmelin, 1791)
- Brachytoma investigatoris Smith, 1899: synonym of Drillia investigatoris (Smith, 1899)
- Brachytoma kawamurai Habe & Kosuge, 1966: synonym of Cheungbeia kawamurai (Habe & Kosuge, 1966) (original combination)
- Brachytoma kurodai Habe & Kosuge, 1966 : synonym of Inquisitor kurodai (Habe & Kosuge, 1966)
- † Brachytoma sacra Reeve, 1845:synonym of † Tylotiella sacra (Reeve, 1845)
- Brachytoma sinensis (Hinds, 1843): synonym of Crassispira sinensis (Hinds, 1843)
- Brachytoma spuria (Hedley, 1922): synonym of Turricula nelliae spuria (Hedley, 1922)
- Brachytoma strombiformis (G. B. Sowerby I, 1832): synonym of Brachytoma stromboides (G. B. Sowerby I, 1832) (incorrect subsequent spelling)
- Brachytoma subsuturalis (E. von Martens, 1902): synonym of Comitas subsuturalis (E. von Martens, 1902)
- Brachytoma sumatrensis Powell, 1966: synonym of Ptychobela sumatrensis (Petit de la Saussaye, 1852)
- Brachytoma takeokensis Otuka, 1949: synonym of Crassispira takeokensis (Otuka, 1949) (original combination)
- Brachytoma tuberosa (E. A. Smith, 1875): synonym of Inquisitor tuberosus (E. A. Smith, 1875)
- Brachytoma vexillum Habe & Kosuge, 1966 : synonym of Ptychobela vexillium (Habe & Kosuge, 1966) (original combination)
- Brachytoma zuiomaru Nomura & Hatai, 1940: synonym of Inquisitor jeffreysii (E. A. Smith, 1875): synonym of Funa jeffreysii (E. A. Smith, 1875)

Further investigation needed

- Brachytoma strombiformis (G.B. Sowerby II, 1839) (species inquirenda)
