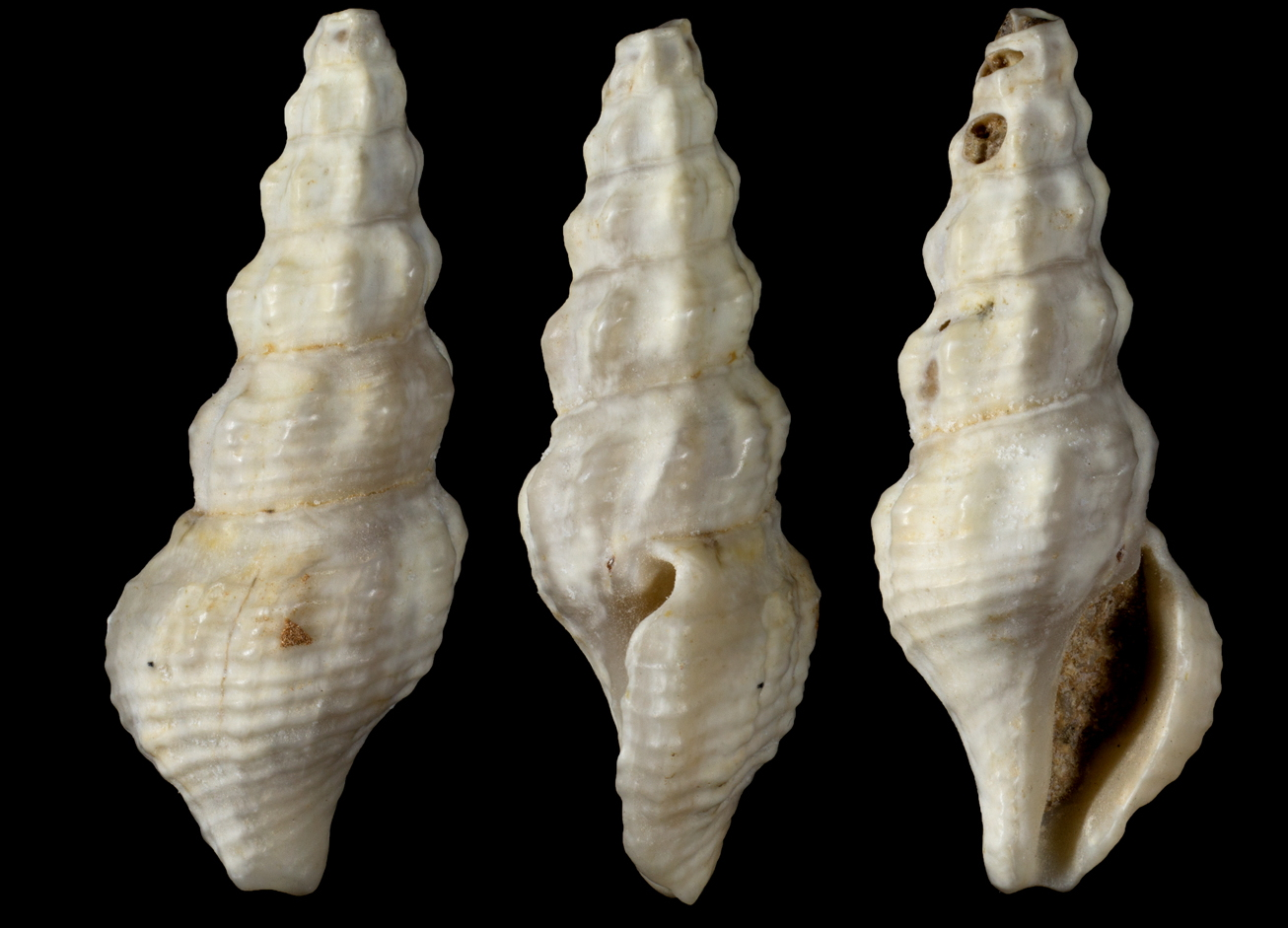
- Shell of Ptychobela baynhami (specimen at MNHN, Paris)

Scientific classification
- Kingdom: Animalia
- Phylum: Mollusca
- Class: Gastropoda
- Subclass: Caenogastropoda
- Order: Neogastropoda
- Superfamily: Conoidea
- Family: Pseudomelatomidae
- Genus: Ptychobela; Thiele, 1925

Type species
- Clavatula crenularis Lamarck, 1816

Species
- See text

= Ptychobela =

Genus of gastropods

Ptychobela is a genus of sea snails, marine gastropod mollusks in the family Pseudomelatomidae.

== Species ==
Species within the genus Ptychobela include:

- Ptychobela baynhami (Smith E. A., 1891)
- Ptychobela dancei Kilburn & Dekker, 2008
- Ptychobela griffithii (Gray, 1834)
- Ptychobela lanceolata (Reeve, 1845)
- Ptychobela lavinia (Dall, 1919)
- Ptychobela minimarus (Kosuge, 1993)
- Ptychobela nodulosa (Gmelin, 1791)
- Ptychobela opisthochetos Kilburn, 1989
- Ptychobela resticula Li B. Q., Kilburn & Li X. Z., 2010
- Ptychobela salebra Li & Li, 2007
- Ptychobela schoedei Thiele, 1925
- Ptychobela sumatrensis (Petit de la Saussaye, 1852)
- Ptychobela superba Thiele, 1925
- Ptychobela suturalis (Gray, 1838)
- Ptychobela vexillium (Habe & Kosuge, 1966)
- Ptychobela zebra Chang, C.K. & W.L. Wu, 2000

Species brought into synonymy

- Ptychobela crenularis (Lamarck, 1816): synonym of Ptychobela nodulosa (Gmelin, 1791)
- Ptychobela flavidula (Lamarck, 1822): synonym of Clathrodrillia flavidula (Lamarck, 1822)
- Ptychobela kawamurai (Habe, T. & S. Kosuge, 1966): synonym of Cheungbeia kawamurai (Habe, T. & S. Kosuge, 1966)
- Ptychobela pseudoprincipalis Yokoyama, 1920 : synonym of Inquisitor pseudoprincipalis (Yokoyama, 1920)
- Ptychobela subochracea Springsteen and Leobrera 1986: synonym of Aguilaria subochracea (Smith, 1877)
- Ptychobela takeokaensis (Otuka, 1949): synonym of Crassispira takeokensis (Otuka, 1949)
