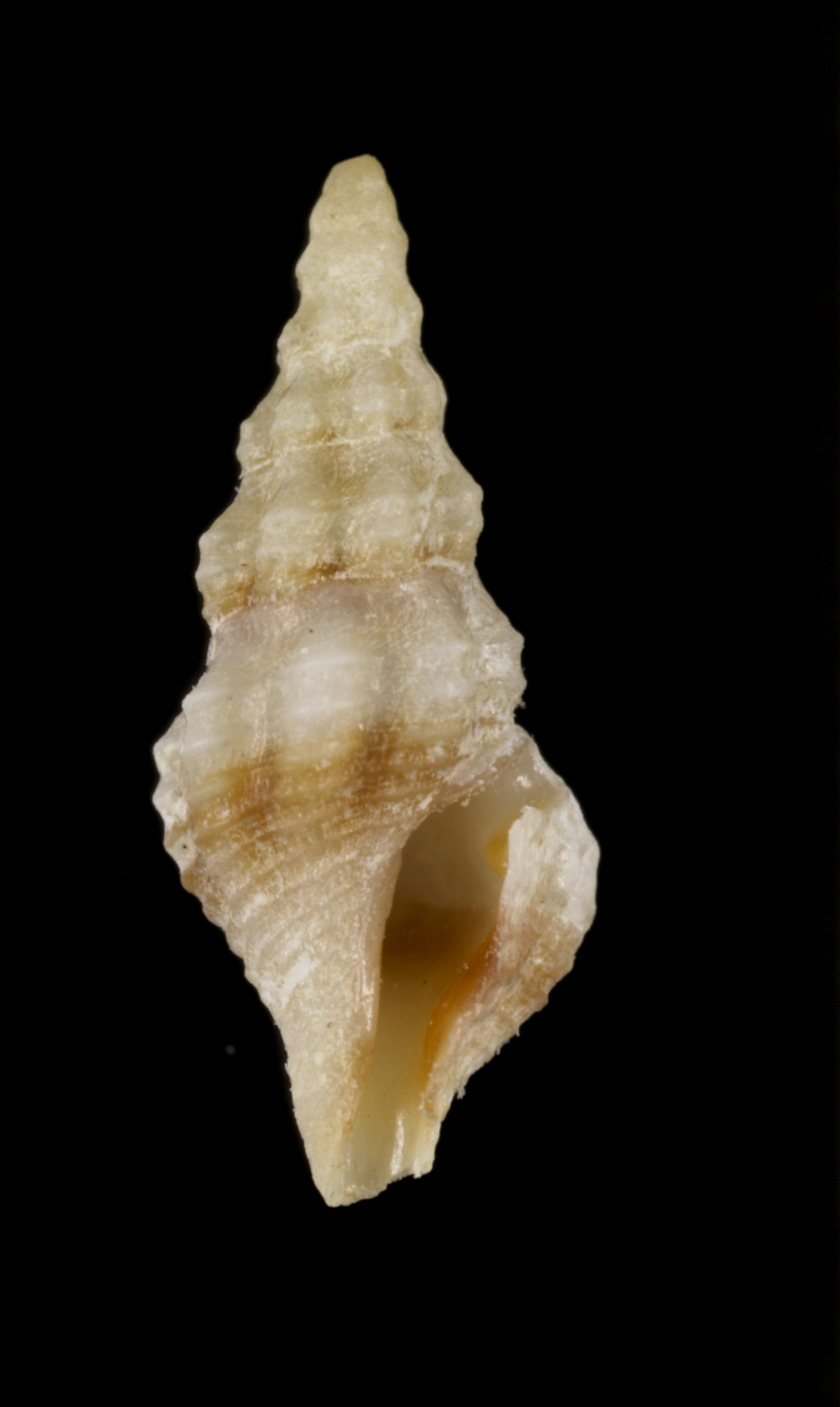
- Shell of Lioglyphostoma adematum (specimen at MNHN, Paris)

Scientific classification
- Kingdom: Animalia
- Phylum: Mollusca
- Class: Gastropoda
- Subclass: Caenogastropoda
- Order: Neogastropoda
- Superfamily: Conoidea
- Family: Pseudomelatomidae
- Genus: Lioglyphostoma; Woodring, 1928

Type species
- Lioglyphostoma adematum Woodring, 1928

Species
- See text

Synonyms
- Glyphostoma (Glyphostomops) Bartsch, 1934

= Lioglyphostoma =

Genus of gastropods

Lioglyphostoma is a genus of sea snails, marine gastropod mollusks in the family Pseudomelatomidae.

== Species ==
Species within the genus Lioglyphostoma include:

- Lioglyphostoma acrocarinatum (Dall, 1927)
- Lioglyphostoma adematum Woodring, 1928
- Lioglyphostoma aguadillanum (Dall & Simpson, 1901)
- Lioglyphostoma antillarum (d'Orbigny, 1842)
- † Lioglyphostoma chinenensis MacNeil, 1960
- Lioglyphostoma crebriforma Shasky & Campbell, 1964
- Lioglyphostoma ericea (Hinds, 1843)
- Lioglyphostoma hendersoni (Bartsch, 1934)
- Lioglyphostoma jousseaumei (Dautzenberg, 1900)
- † Lioglyphostoma moinica (Olsson, 1922)
- Lioglyphostoma oenoa (Bartsch, 1934)
- Lioglyphostoma rectilabrum McLean & Poorman, 1971
- † Lioglyphostoma rusum Gardner, 1937
- † Lioglyphostoma tenuata MacNeil, 1960
- † Lioglyphostoma tyro Gardner, 1937
- Lioglyphostoma woodringi Fargo, 1953

Species brought into synonymy

- Lioglyphostoma acapulcanum Pilsbry & Lowe, 1932: synonym of Miraclathurella bicanalifera (G.B. Sowerby I, 1834)
- Lioglyphostoma armstrongi J. G. Hertlein & A. M. Strong, 1955: synonym of Glyphostoma neglecta (Hinds, R.B., 1843)
- Lioglyphostoma canna (Dall, 1889): synonym of Compsodrillia canna (Dall, 1889)
- Lioglyphostoma rioensis (E.A. Smith, 1915): synonym of Brachytoma rioensis (E. A. Smith, 1915)
- Lioglyphostoma sirena Dall, 1919: synonym of Lioglyphostoma ericea (Hinds, 1843)
