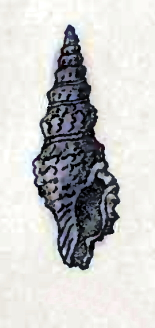
- Miraclathurella bicanalifera

Scientific classification
- Kingdom: Animalia
- Phylum: Mollusca
- Class: Gastropoda
- Subclass: Caenogastropoda
- Order: Neogastropoda
- Superfamily: Conoidea
- Family: Pseudomelatomidae
- Genus: Miraclathurella; Woodring, 1928

Type species
- Miraclathurella vittata Woodring, 1928

Species
- See text

= Miraclathurella =

Genus of gastropods

Miraclathurella is a genus of sea snails, marine gastropod mollusks in the family Pseudomelatomidae.

== Species ==
Species within the genus Miraclathurella include:

- † Miraclathurella amica (Pilsbry & Johnson, 1917)
- Miraclathurella bicanalifera (Sowerby I, 1834)
- † Miraclathurella darwini (Philippi, 1887)
- † Miraclathurella entemma Woodring, 1928
- † Miraclathurella eucharis Woodring, 1970
- † Miraclathurella gracilis (Gabb, 1866)
- Miraclathurella herminea (Bartsch, 1934)
- Miraclathurella mendozana Shasky, 1971
- † Miraclathurella vittata Woodring, 1928

Species brought into synonymy

- Miraclathurella acapulcanum Pilsbry & Lowe, 1932 : synonym of Miraclathurella bicanalifera (G.B. Sowerby I, 1834)
- Miraclathurella aguadillana (Dall & Stimpson, 1901): synonym of Lioglyphostoma aguadillanum (Dall & Stimpson, 1901)
- Miraclathurella clendenini García, 2008: synonym of Darrylia clendenini (García, 2008) (original combination)
- Miraclathurella gracillima Carpenter, 1856:synonym of Miraclathurella bicanalifera (G.B. Sowerby I, 1834)
- Miraclathurella kleinrosa (Nowell-Usticke, 1969): synonym of Darrylia kleinrosa (Nowell-Usticke, 1969)
- Miraclathurella nitida Sowerby I, 1834:synonym of Miraclathurella bicanalifera (G.B. Sowerby I, 1834)
- Miraclathurella peggywilliamsae Fallon, 2010: synonym of Darrylia peggywilliamsae (Fallon, 2010) (original combination)
- Miraclathurella variculosa Sowerby I, 1834 :synonym of Miraclathurella bicanalifera (G.B. Sowerby I, 1834)
