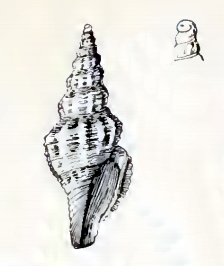
- Original image of a shell and protoconch of Inquisitor carmen

Scientific classification
- Kingdom: Animalia
- Phylum: Mollusca
- Class: Gastropoda
- Subclass: Caenogastropoda
- Order: Neogastropoda
- Superfamily: Conoidea
- Family: Pseudomelatomidae
- Genus: Inquisitor
- Species: I. carmen

Binomial name
- Inquisitor carmen (Sowerby III, 1916)

Synonyms
- Drillia carmen Sowerby III, 1916

= Inquisitor carmen =

Species of gastropod

Inquisitor carmen is a species of sea snail, a marine gastropod mollusk in the family Pseudomelatomidae, the turrids and allies.

== Description ==
The length of the shell attains 18 mm, its diameter 8 mm.

The fusiform shell has an elongate, acute spire and contains 8½ whorls of which two in the protoconch. The subsequent convex whorls are somewhat angular and show numerous rounded, obtusely angulated longitudinal plicae. The shell is finely spirally lirate throughout. The plicae are rendered conspicuous by the light-brown colouring of the interstices. The suture is slightly impressed. The body whorl measures half the total length. The body whorl is at the top obtusely angulated, then slightly convex and below the middle part contracted and attenuated. The aperture is oblong with a small siphonal canal. The columella stands upright. The outer lip is sharp.

== Distribution ==
This species occurs in the China Seas and off Japan.
