= Sinurothoe =

Scientific classification
- Domain: Eukaryota
- Kingdom: Animalia
- Phylum: Arthropoda
- Class: Malacostraca
- Order: Amphipoda
- Family: Sinurothoidae
- Genus: Sinurothoe; Ren, 1999

Genus of crustaceans

Sinurothoe is a genus of crustaceans belonging to the monotypic family Sinurothoidae.

The species of this genus are found in China Sea.

Species:

- Sinurothoe armatus Ren, 2012
- Sinurothoe sinensis Ren, 1999
