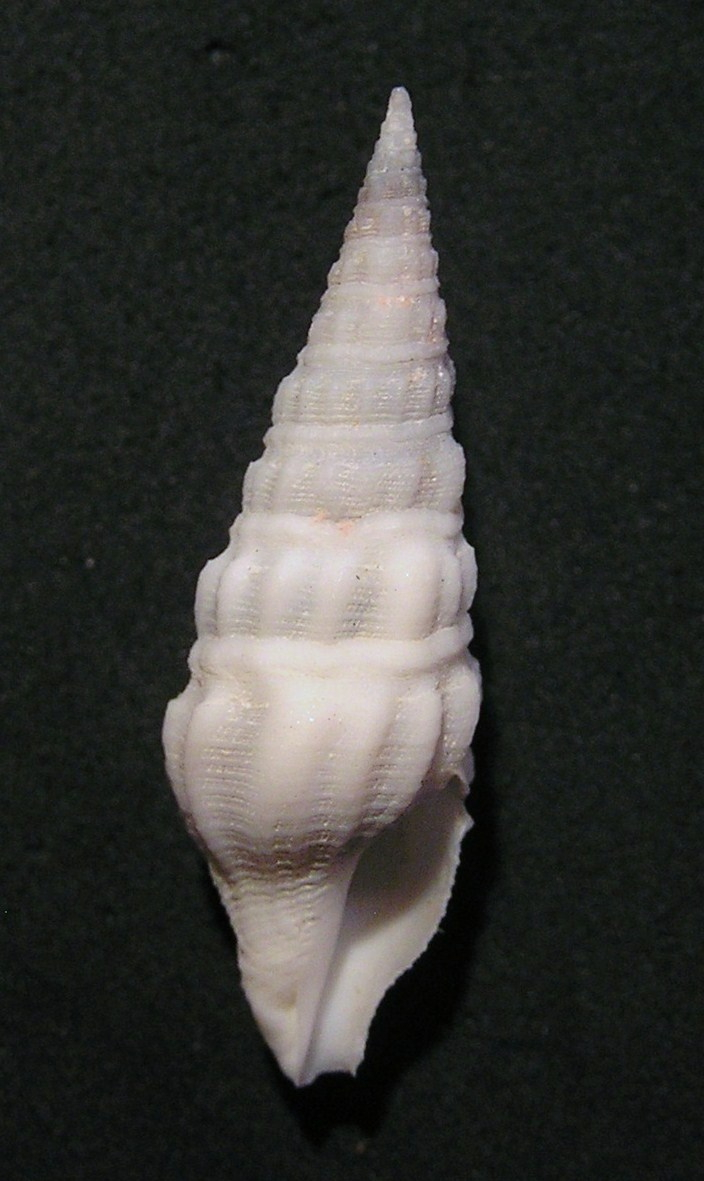
- Apertural view of a shell of Inquisitor alabaster

Scientific classification
- Kingdom: Animalia
- Phylum: Mollusca
- Class: Gastropoda
- Subclass: Caenogastropoda
- Order: Neogastropoda
- Superfamily: Conoidea
- Family: Pseudomelatomidae
- Genus: Inquisitor
- Species: I. alabaster

Binomial name
- Inquisitor alabaster (Reeve, 1843)

Synonyms
- Clavus alabaster (Reeve, 1843); Drillia (Crassispira) alabaster (Reeve, 1843); Inquisitor alabastes (Reeve, 1843); Pleurotoma alabaster Reeve, 1843

= Inquisitor alabaster =

Species of gastropod

Inquisitor alabaster is a species of sea snail, a marine gastropod mollusk in the family Pseudomelatomidae, the turrids and allies.

== Description ==
The length of the shell varies between 30 mm and 40 mm.

The turreted shell is snowy white, sometimes faintly rose-tinged. It is longitudinally ribbed, with very fine revolving grooves and striae. It is somewhat depressed next the suture. The sinus is broad.

== Distribution ==
This marine species occurs off the Philippines and in the China Seas.
