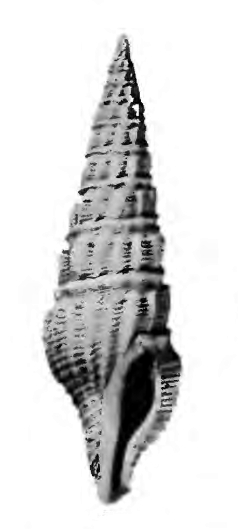
- Image of a shell of Crassispira pseudoprincipalis

Scientific classification
- Kingdom: Animalia
- Phylum: Mollusca
- Class: Gastropoda
- Subclass: Caenogastropoda
- Order: Neogastropoda
- Superfamily: Conoidea
- Family: Pseudomelatomidae
- Genus: Crassispira
- Species: C. pseudoprincipalis

Binomial name
- Crassispira pseudoprincipalis (Yokoyama, 1920)

Synonyms
- Clavus (Braohytoma) pseudoprincipalis Nomura, 1935; Drillia, pseudo-principalis Yokoyama, 1926; Inquisitor pseudoprincipalis. Makiyama, 1927; Pleurotoma, (Drillia) pseudo-principalis Yokoyama, 1920 (original combination)

= Crassispira pseudoprincipalis =

Extinct species of gastropod

Crassispira pseudoprincipalis is an extinct species of sea snail, a marine gastropod mollusk in the family Pseudomelatomidae, the turrids and their allies.

There seems to be confusion about the accepted name of this species. According to the University of Tokyo, the accepted name is Crassispira pseudoprincipalis, while according to the World Register of Marine Species, the accepted name is Inquisitor pseudoprincipalis. Both rely on the basionym Pleurotoma (Drillia) pseudoprincipalis Yokoyama, 1920.

== Description ==
The length of the shell attains 27.5 mm, its diameter 8.3 mm.

According to Makiyama (1927, p. 104), Japanese specimens of this species differ from Crassispira bataviana (Martin, 1895) in having a shorter siphonal canal. The same appears to be true of the Okinawan and Formosan specimens.

== Distribution ==
Fossils have been found in Miocene in Japan and in Pliocene strata in Okinawa, Japan.
