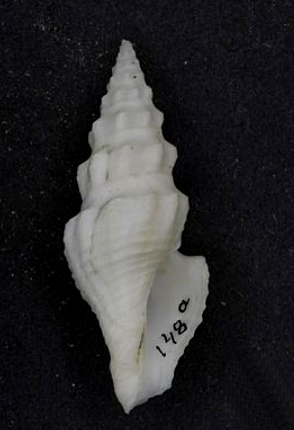
- Shell of Funa latisinuata (specimen at Naturalis Biodiversity Center)

Scientific classification
- Kingdom: Animalia
- Phylum: Mollusca
- Class: Gastropoda
- Subclass: Caenogastropoda
- Order: Neogastropoda
- Superfamily: Conoidea
- Family: Pseudomelatomidae
- Genus: Funa
- Species: F. latisinuata

Binomial name
- Funa latisinuata (E.A. Smith, 1877)

Synonyms
- Pleurotoma latisinuata E. A. Smith, 1877 (original combination); Pleurotoma (Drillia) latisinuata E.A. Smith, 1877

= Funa latisinuata =

Species of gastropod

Funa latisinuata is a species of sea snail, a marine gastropod mollusk in the family Pseudomelatomidae, the turrids and allies.

== Description ==
The length of the shell attains 50 mm, its diameter 35 mm.

The fusiform and turreted shell contains 12 whorls. These are excavated above, carinated and angulated in the middle and below the angle obliquely plicated. The upper half of each whorl is nearly smooth, as the plications extend scarcely beyond the central large spiral liration which marks the angulation of the whorls. Sometimes, this lira being double, the whorls are less acutely angular. The color is yellowish brown, with white revolving lirae. The siphonal canal is moderately long and slightly curved.

== Distribution ==
This species occurs in the China seas and off the Andaman Islands.
