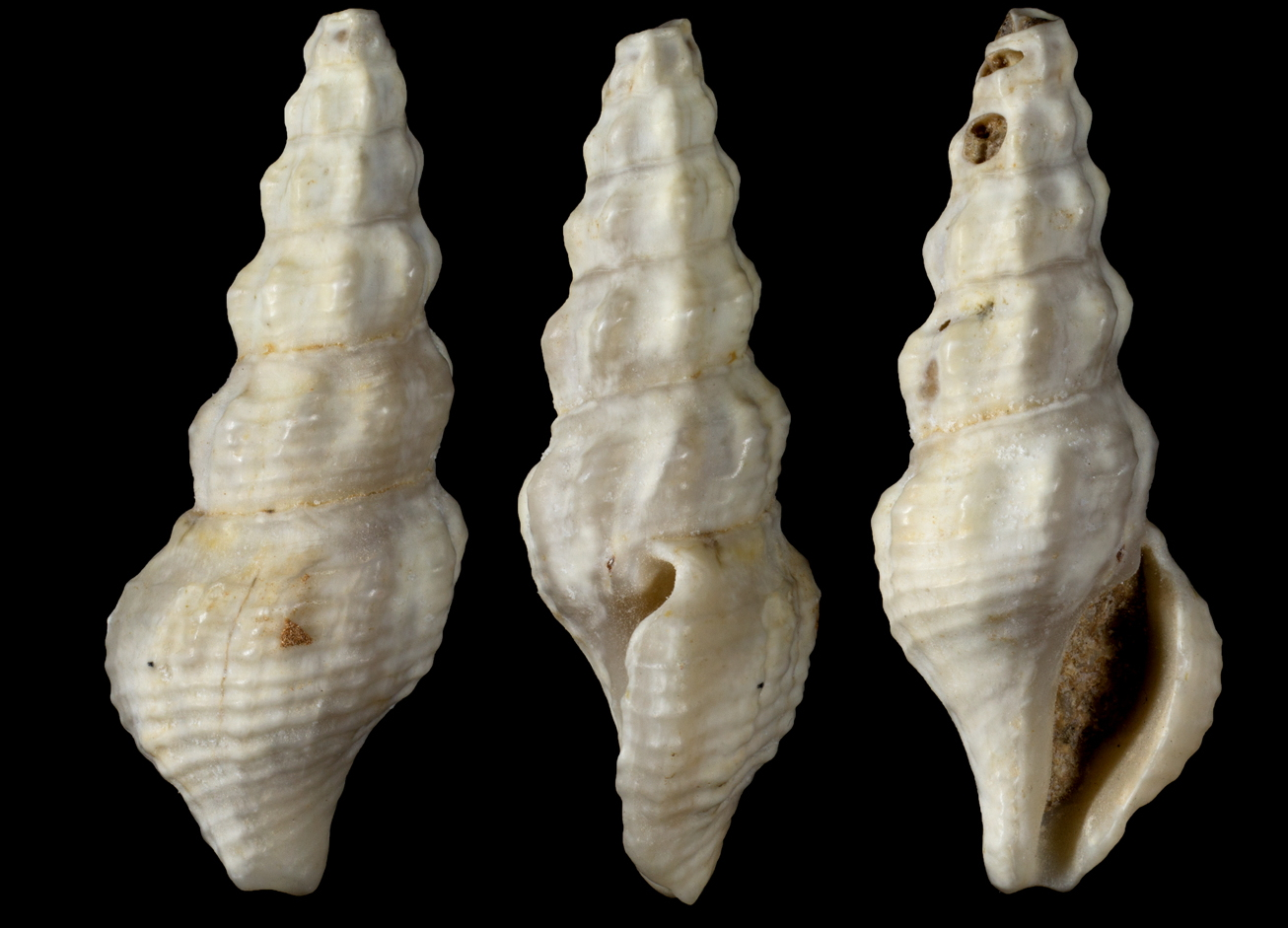
- Shell of Ptychobela baynhami (specimen at MNHN, Paris)

Scientific classification
- Kingdom: Animalia
- Phylum: Mollusca
- Class: Gastropoda
- Subclass: Caenogastropoda
- Order: Neogastropoda
- Superfamily: Conoidea
- Family: Pseudomelatomidae
- Genus: Ptychobela
- Species: P. baynhami

Binomial name
- Ptychobela baynhami (E.A. Smith, 1891)

Synonyms
- Drillia baynhami Melvill & Standen, 1901; Pleurotoma baynhami E.A. Smith, 1891

= Ptychobela baynhami =

Species of gastropod

Ptychobela baynhami is a species of sea snail, a marine gastropod mollusk in the family Pseudomelatomidae, the turrids and allies.

== Description ==
The length of the shell attains 29 mm, its diameter 9 mm.

Like Ptychobela suturalis (Gray, 1838), this fusiform, turreted species has a raised fillet at the suture. But it may be distinguished by its shorter body whorl, its more pronounced ribs, and the difference of colour. The shell contains 12 whorls; the first two are smooth and globose. The subsequent whorls are concave above the middle and convex below. The ribs (in the penultimate whorl 9–10) become obsolete a little above the middle of the whorls where the concavity commences, and, being traversed by a distinct tenuous white spiral thread, have a somewhat angulated appearance. The aperture measures 2/5th of the total length. The inner part of the aperture is livid. The columella is slightly arcuate and has a minute callus.

== Distribution ==
This marine species occurs in the Indian Ocean off Aden and Somalia
