= Miraclathurella amica =

Scientific classification
- Kingdom: Animalia
- Phylum: Mollusca
- Class: Gastropoda
- Subclass: Caenogastropoda
- Order: Neogastropoda
- Superfamily: Conoidea
- Family: Pseudomelatomidae
- Genus: Miraclathurella
- Species: M. amica

Binomial name
- Miraclathurella amica (H.A. Pilsbry & Johnson, 1927)

Synonyms
- Clathurella amica H.A. Pilsbry & Johnson, 1917

Extinct species of gastropod

Miraclathurella amica is an extinct species of sea snail, a marine gastropod mollusk in the family Pseudomelatomidae, the turrids and allies.

== Description ==
The length of the shell is 16.3 mm, its dialmeter 5.25 mm.

(Original description) This extinct species resembles Miraclathurella gracilis but it is less slender and the whorls are shorter and revolve less obliquely. It has the same number of axial ribs and spiral threads but, as they are relatively larger, they are much more crowded than in M. gracilis. The fine spiral lines between the prominent raised threads are very minute. The lip varix is noticeably larger and the aperture is wider. The callous nodule on the body next to the sinus is much larger than in M. gracilis.

== Distribution ==
Fossils of this species were found in Oligocene strata in Santo Domingo, Dominican Republic.
