= Chinese Sea =

Chinese Sea may refer to:

- Gulf of Mexico, the water when the Spanish first arrived in 1513, thought to be in route to Asia and thus named
- China Seas, a series of seas around China
