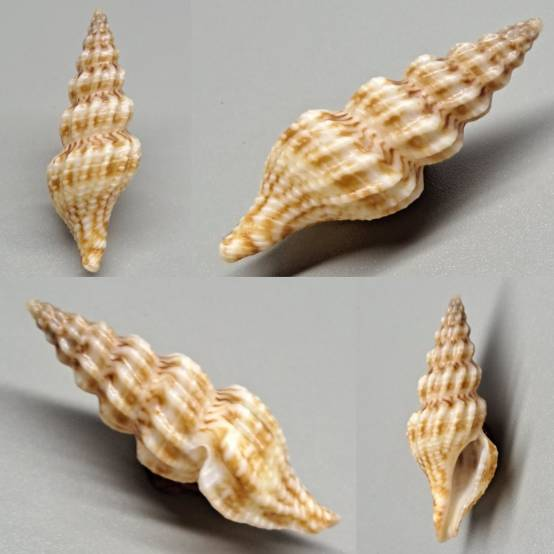

Scientific classification
- Kingdom: Animalia
- Phylum: Mollusca
- Class: Gastropoda
- Subclass: Caenogastropoda
- Order: Neogastropoda
- Superfamily: Conoidea
- Family: Pseudomelatomidae
- Genus: Cheungbeia
- Species: C. laterculata

Binomial name
- Cheungbeia laterculata (G. B. Sowerby II, 1870)

Synonyms
- Drillia laterculata Schepman 1913; Inquisitor laterculata (G. B. Sowerby II, 1870); Inquisitor zonata (non Reeve, 1843): Chang and Wu 2000; Pleurotoma laterculata G. B. Sowerby II, 1870 (original combination)

= Cheungbeia laterculata =

Species of gastropod

Cheungbeia laterculata is a species of sea snail, a marine gastropod mollusk in the family Pseudomelatomidae, the turrids and allies.

== Description ==
The length of the shell attains 22 mm, its diameter 7.5 mm.

The shell is fusiform, solid, and smooth. It is longitudinally ribbed and tessellated with red square spots. The spire is pyramidal. The whorls are angulate in the middle, with two keels present at the angle, and are tuberculated at the ribs. The aperture is subpyriform, and the inner lip is thickened externally and emarginate near the suture. (Note: Original description of C. laterculata was written in Latin by G. B. Sowerby II, 1870.)

== Distribution ==
This species appears in the China Seas, on the coastal areas of Vietnam, and from Southeast India to Queensland, Australia.
