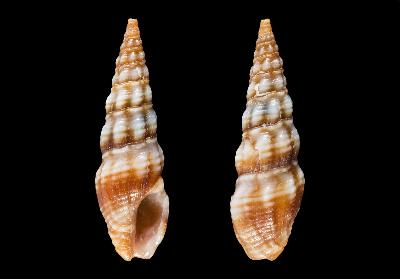
- Shell of Funa fourlinniei (specimen at MNHN, Paris)

Scientific classification
- Kingdom: Animalia
- Phylum: Mollusca
- Class: Gastropoda
- Subclass: Caenogastropoda
- Order: Neogastropoda
- Superfamily: Conoidea
- Family: Pseudomelatomidae
- Genus: Funa; Kilburn, 1988

Type species
- Drillia laterculoides Barnard, 1958

Species
- See text

= Funa (gastropod) =

Genus of gastropods

Funa is a genus of sea snails, marine gastropod mollusks in the family Pseudomelatomidae.

== Species ==
Species within the genus Funa include:

- Funa asra Kilburn, 1988
- Funa cretea Li B.Q., Kilburn & Li X.Z., 2010
- Funa fourlinniei Bozzetti, 2007
- Funa fraterculus Kilburn, 1988
- Funa hadra Sysoev & Bouchet, 2001
- Funa incisospirata Horro, Gori & Renda, 2025
- Funa jeffreysii (E. A. Smith, 1875)
- Funa laterculoides (Barnard, 1958)
- Funa latisinuata (Smith E. A., 1877)
- Funa pseudotheoreta Horro, Gori & Renda, 2025
- Funa spectrum (Reeve, 1845) (nomen dubium)
- Funa tayloriana (Reeve, 1846)
- Funa theoreta (Melvill, 1899)
- Funa trigoi Horro, Gori, Rosado & Rolán, 2021
- Funa variabilis (E. A. Smith, 1877)
- Funa zahariasi Horro, Gori & Renda, 2025

Species brought into synonymy

- Funa flavidula (Lamarck, 1822): synonym of Clathrodrillia flavidula (Lamarck, 1822)
- Funa formidabilis (Hedley, 1922): synonym of Inquisitor formidabilis Hedley, 1922
