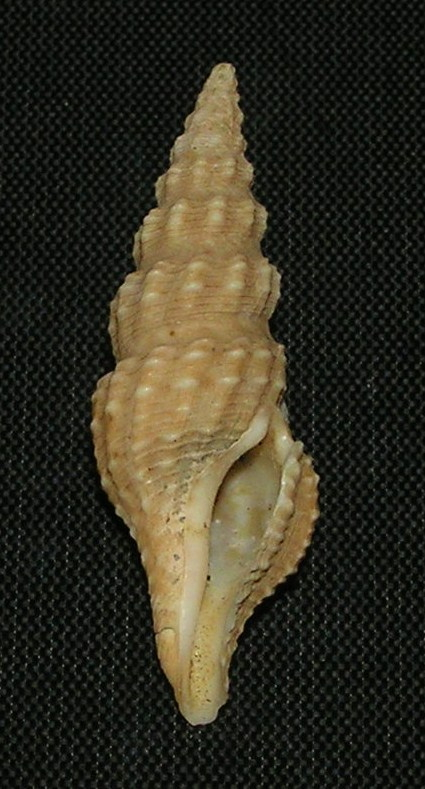
- Shell of Ptychobela zebra

Scientific classification
- Kingdom: Animalia
- Phylum: Mollusca
- Class: Gastropoda
- Subclass: Caenogastropoda
- Order: Neogastropoda
- Superfamily: Conoidea
- Family: Pseudomelatomidae
- Genus: Ptychobela
- Species: P. zebra

Binomial name
- Ptychobela zebra Chang, C.K. & W.L. Wu, 2000

= Ptychobela zebra =

Species of gastropod

Ptychobela zebra is a species of sea snail, a marine gastropod mollusk in the family Pseudomelatomidae, the turrids and allies.

== Description ==
The shell reaches 30 mm (1.2 in) in length.

The protoconch consists of two smooth whorls. The eight subsequent whorls contain thirteen axial ribs, crossed by (ten on the penultimate whorl) fine and unequal spiral cords forming brown nodules. The shell is cream-colored.

== Distribution ==
This marine species occurs off the Philippines.
