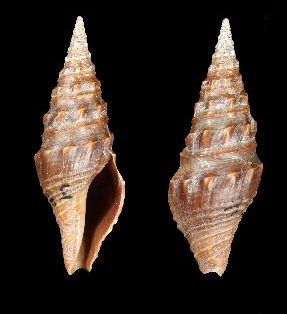
- Shells of Ptychobela opisthochetos (paratype at MNHN, Paris)

Scientific classification
- Kingdom: Animalia
- Phylum: Mollusca
- Class: Gastropoda
- Subclass: Caenogastropoda
- Order: Neogastropoda
- Superfamily: Conoidea
- Family: Pseudomelatomidae
- Genus: Ptychobela
- Species: P. opisthochetos

Binomial name
- Ptychobela opisthochetos Kilburn, 1989

= Ptychobela opisthochetos =

Species of gastropod

Ptychobela opisthochetos is a species of sea snail, a marine gastropod mollusk in the family Pseudomelatomidae, the turrids and their allies.

== Description ==
The length of the shell varies between 18 mm and 30 mm.

== Distribution ==
This species occurs in the Indian Ocean between Mozambique and the Gulf of Oman.
