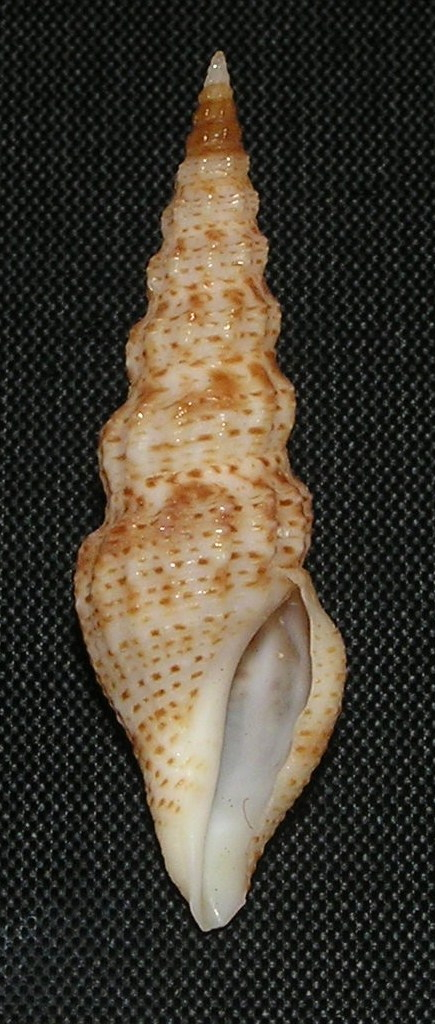
- Apertural view of a shell of Funa asra

Scientific classification
- Kingdom: Animalia
- Phylum: Mollusca
- Class: Gastropoda
- Subclass: Caenogastropoda
- Order: Neogastropoda
- Superfamily: Conoidea
- Family: Pseudomelatomidae
- Genus: Funa
- Species: F. asra

Binomial name
- Funa asra Kilburn, 1988

= Funa asra =

Species of gastropod

Funa asra is a species of sea snail, a marine gastropod mollusk in the family Pseudomelatomidae, the turrids and allies.

== Description ==
The length of the shell varies between 45 mm and 60 mm.

== Distribution ==
This marine species occurs off KwaZulu Natal, South Africa, and Mozambique.
