= Ptychobela resticula =

Scientific classification
- Kingdom: Animalia
- Phylum: Mollusca
- Class: Gastropoda
- Subclass: Caenogastropoda
- Order: Neogastropoda
- Superfamily: Conoidea
- Family: Pseudomelatomidae
- Genus: Ptychobela
- Species: P. resticula

Binomial name
- Ptychobela resticula Li B. Q., Kilburn & Li X. Z., 2010

Species of gastropod

Ptychobela resticula is a species of sea snail, a marine gastropod mollusk in the family Pseudomelatomidae, the turrids and allies. The length of its shell varies between 33 mm and 41.5 mm. This species occurs in the South China Sea.
