= Lioglyphostoma crebriforma =

Scientific classification
- Kingdom: Animalia
- Phylum: Mollusca
- Class: Gastropoda
- Subclass: Caenogastropoda
- Order: Neogastropoda
- Superfamily: Conoidea
- Family: Pseudomelatomidae
- Genus: Lioglyphostoma
- Species: L. crebriforma

Binomial name
- Lioglyphostoma crebriforma Shasky, D.R. & G.B. Campbell, 1964

Species of gastropod

Lioglyphostoma crebriforma is a species of sea snail, a marine gastropod mollusk in the family Pseudomelatomidae, the turrids and allies.

== Distribution ==
This marine species occurs in the Sea of Cortez, West Mexico
