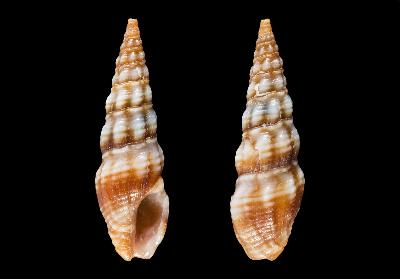
- Shell of Funa fourlinniei (holotype in MNHN, Paris)

Scientific classification
- Kingdom: Animalia
- Phylum: Mollusca
- Class: Gastropoda
- Subclass: Caenogastropoda
- Order: Neogastropoda
- Superfamily: Conoidea
- Family: Pseudomelatomidae
- Genus: Funa
- Species: F. fourlinniei

Binomial name
- Funa fourlinniei Bozzetti, 2007

= Funa fourlinniei =

Species of gastropod

Funa fourlinniei is a species of sea snail, a marine gastropod mollusk in the family Pseudomelatomidae, the turrids and allies.

== Description ==
The length of the shell attains 16 mm.

== Distribution ==
This marine species occurs off Madagascar.
