= Miraclathurella eucharis =

Scientific classification
- Kingdom: Animalia
- Phylum: Mollusca
- Class: Gastropoda
- Subclass: Caenogastropoda
- Order: Neogastropoda
- Superfamily: Conoidea
- Family: Pseudomelatomidae
- Genus: Miraclathurella
- Species: M. eucharis

Binomial name
- Miraclathurella eucharis Woodring 1970

Extinct species of gastropod

Miraclathurella eucharis is an extinct species of sea snail, a marine gastropod mollusk in the family Pseudomelatomidae, the turrids and allies.

== Distribution ==
Fossils of this species were found in Miocene strata in Panama; age range: 11.608 to 7.246 Ma.
