= Ptychobela lanceolata =

Scientific classification
- Kingdom: Animalia
- Phylum: Mollusca
- Class: Gastropoda
- Subclass: Caenogastropoda
- Order: Neogastropoda
- Superfamily: Conoidea
- Family: Pseudomelatomidae
- Genus: Ptychobela
- Species: P. lanceolata

Binomial name
- Ptychobela lanceolata (Reeve, L.A., 1845)

Synonyms
- † Inquisitor lanceolatus (Hupé, 1854); † Pleurotoma lanceolata Hupé, 1854

Species of gastropod

Ptychobela lanceolata is a species of sea snail, a marine gastropod mollusc in the family Pseudomelatomidae, the turrids and allies.

== Description ==
The length of the shell attains 17 mm.

== Distribution ==
This species occurs off Papua New Guinea and Solomon Islands
