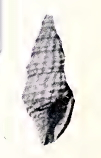
- Original image of a shell of † Lioglyphostoma moinica

Scientific classification
- Kingdom: Animalia
- Phylum: Mollusca
- Class: Gastropoda
- Subclass: Caenogastropoda
- Order: Neogastropoda
- Superfamily: Conoidea
- Family: Pseudomelatomidae
- Genus: Lioglyphostoma
- Species: L. moinica

Binomial name
- Lioglyphostoma moinica (Olsson 1922)

Synonyms
- † Glyphostoma moinica A.A. Olsson, 1922

= Lioglyphostoma moinica =

Extinct species of gastropod

Lioglyphostoma moinica is an extinct species of sea snail, a marine gastropod mollusk in the family Pseudomelatomidae, the turrids and allies.

== Description ==
The length of the shell attains 5.75 mm; its diameter 2.75 mm.

(Original description) The small, solid shell has a coarse, tuberculate, subreticulate sculpture and a thickened, enlarged outer lip. The protoconch is small, pointed and tapering of 3 or more, smooth, convex whorls followed by about 4 post-nuclear whorls. The sculpture consists of about 14 narrow ribs continuous from the siphonal canal to the upper suture and crossed by even, spiral cords. Their intersection form small rounded beds or tubercles. Immediately after the protoconch, there is but one spiral, soon followed by two and on the penultimate whorl there are three. The body whorl has five spirals and three or four more on the siphonal canal. The aperture is elliptical with a large expanded outer lip, smooth within and a deep, anal sinus at its upper end. The siphonal canal is short and straight.

== Distribution ==
Fossils have been found in Pliocene strata of the Costa Rica and Jamaica age range: 3.6 to 2.588 Ma.
