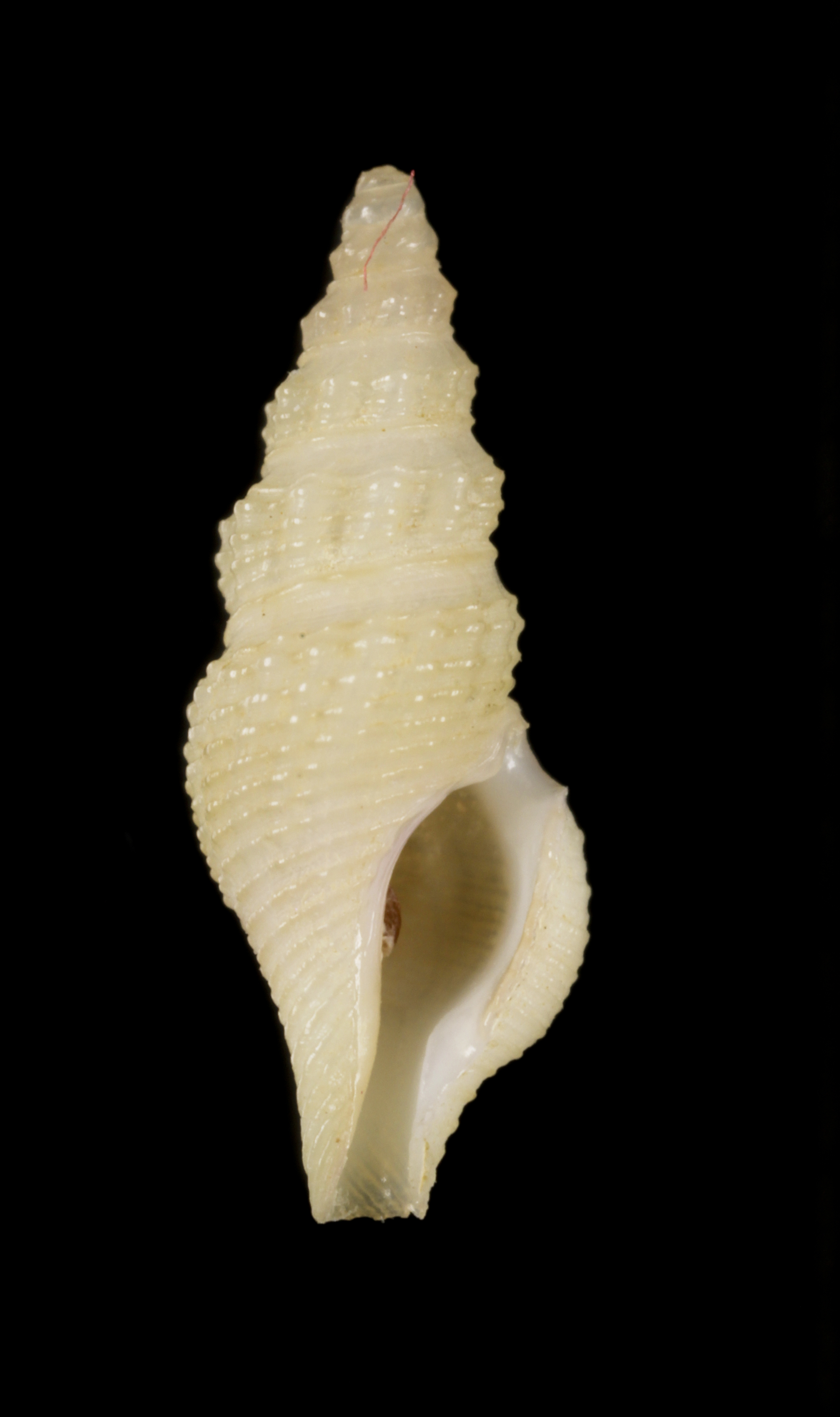
- Shell of Lioglyphostoma jousseaumei

Scientific classification
- Kingdom: Animalia
- Phylum: Mollusca
- Class: Gastropoda
- Subclass: Caenogastropoda
- Order: Neogastropoda
- Superfamily: Conoidea
- Family: Pseudomelatomidae
- Genus: Lioglyphostoma
- Species: L. jousseaumei

Binomial name
- Lioglyphostoma jousseaumei (Dautzenberg, 1900)

Synonyms
- Drillia jousseaumei Dautzenberg, 1900

= Lioglyphostoma jousseaumei =

Species of gastropod

Lioglyphostoma jousseaumei is a species of sea snail, a marine gastropod mollusk in the family Pseudomelatomidae, the turrids.

== Description ==
The length of the shell attains 13 mm.

== Distribution ==
This marine species occurs off New Caledonia and off the Andaman Islands; in the Caribbean Sea off Guadeloupe.
