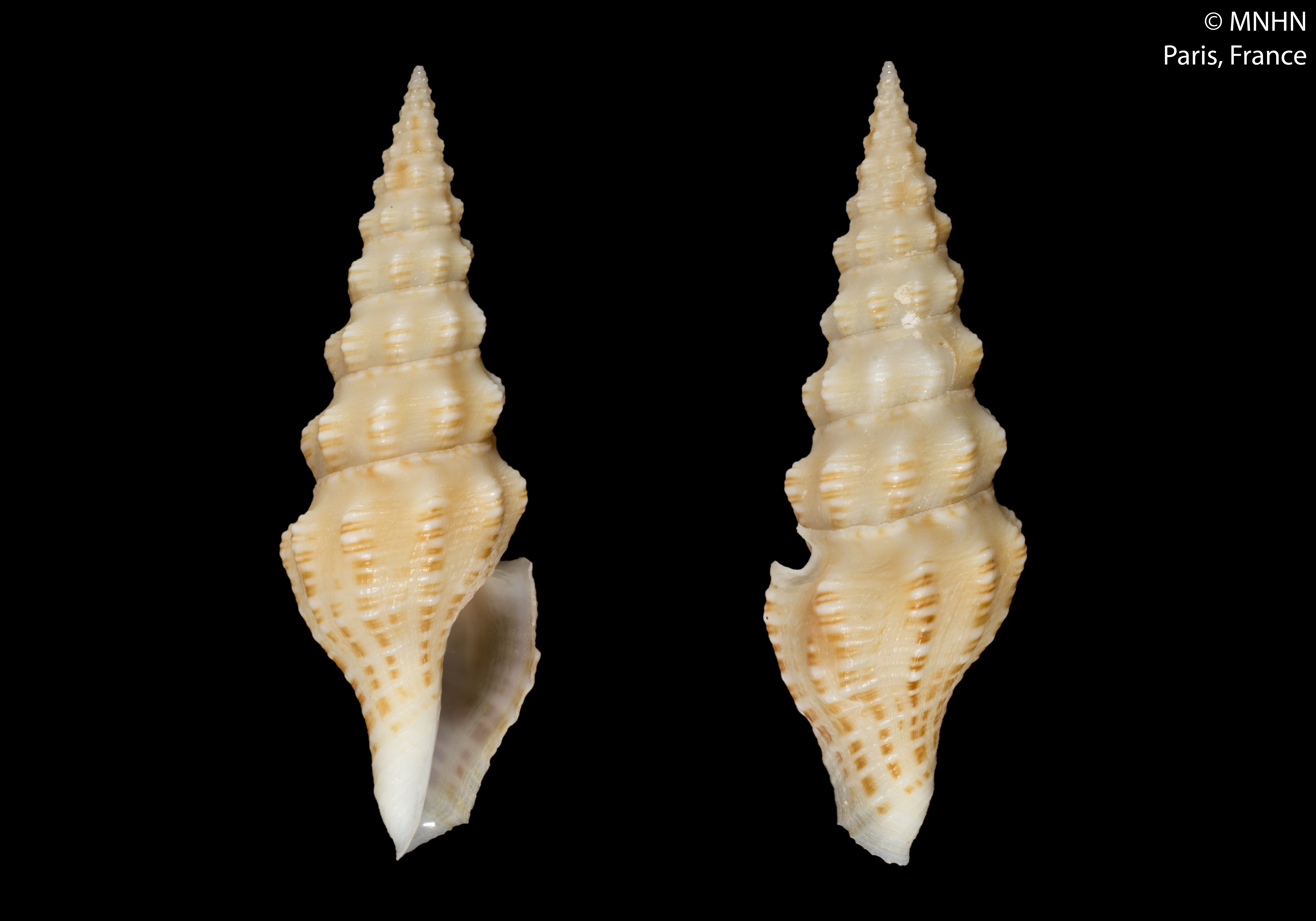

Scientific classification
- Kingdom: Animalia
- Phylum: Mollusca
- Class: Gastropoda
- Subclass: Caenogastropoda
- Order: Neogastropoda
- Superfamily: Conoidea
- Family: Pseudomelatomidae
- Genus: Funa
- Species: F. hadra

Binomial name
- Funa hadra Sysoev & Bouchet, 2001

= Funa hadra =

Species of gastropod

Funa hadra is a species of sea snail, a marine gastropod mollusk in the family Pseudomelatomidae, the turrids and allies

== Description ==
The length of the shell attains 45 mm.

== Distribution ==
This marine species occurs off New Caledonia.
