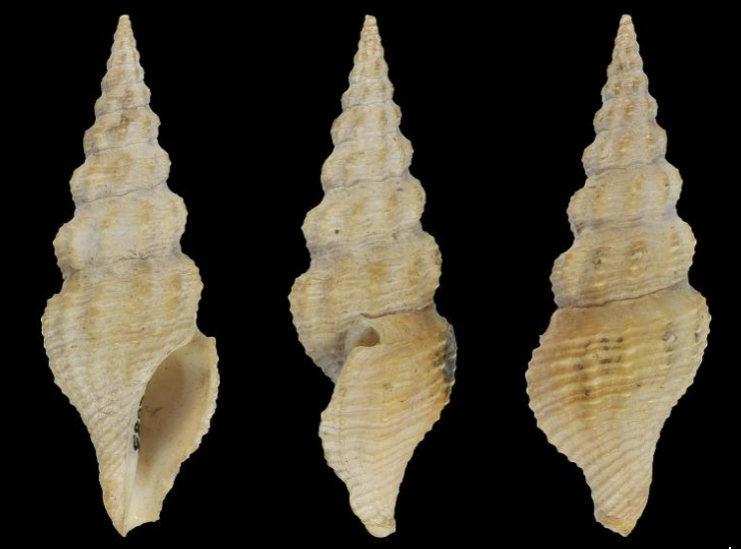
- Shell of Ptychobela lavinia (hootype at the Smithsonian Institution)

Scientific classification
- Kingdom: Animalia
- Phylum: Mollusca
- Class: Gastropoda
- Subclass: Caenogastropoda
- Order: Neogastropoda
- Superfamily: Conoidea
- Family: Pseudomelatomidae
- Genus: Ptychobela
- Species: P. lavinia

Binomial name
- Ptychobela lavinia (Dall, 1919)

Synonyms
- Turricula (Surcula) lavinia Dall, 1919

= Ptychobela lavinia =

Species of gastropod

Ptychobela lavinia, common name the lavinia turrid, is a species of sea snail, a marine gastropod mollusk in the family Pseudomelatomidae, the turrids and allies.

== Description ==
The length of the shell varies between 35 mm and 50 mm.

(Original description) the shell is rather coarse with about a dozen whorls. The color of the shell is yellowish or light brown. The protoconch is smooth and slightly bulbous. The suture is strongly appressed with a spiral cord in front of it. The whorls are moderatelyshouldered. The anal fasciole is somewhat concave and spirally striate. The axial sculpture consists of (on the body whorl about 12) protractively oblique rounded ribs with subequal interspaces, prominent on the periphery, attenuated on the base and not reaching the siphonal canal. The incremental lines are sharp, sometimes almost threadlike. The spiral sculpture consists of (from three to five on the spire, about 10 on the body whorl) strong, rounded cords overriding the ribs and not swollen at the intersections. The interspaces are subequal and sometimes with an intercalated smaller thread. Lastly the surface is finely minutely spirally striate in the intervals between the larger threads and cords. The aperture is narrow. The anal sulcus is close to the suture, short and rounded, with a subsutural callus. The outer lip is produced, thin edged, more or less crenulate from the spiral sculpture and smooth within. The inner lip and the columella show a rather thick layer of callus with a slightly raised outer edge. The columella is straight. The siphonal fasciole is feeble. The siphonal canal is short, wide and recurved.

== Distribution ==
This species occurs in the Pacific Ocean between Mexico and Peru
