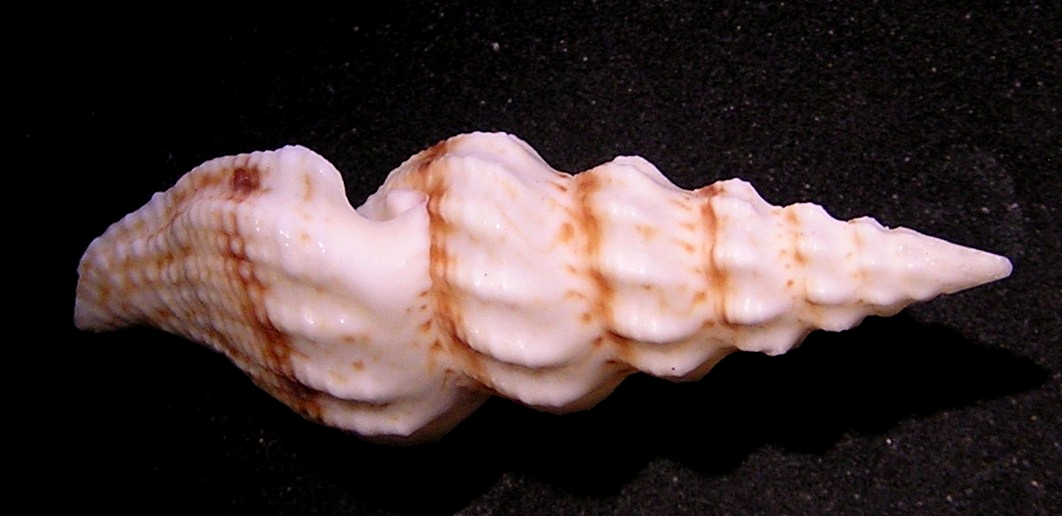
- Shell of Cheungbeia mindanensis

Scientific classification
- Kingdom: Animalia
- Phylum: Mollusca
- Class: Gastropoda
- Subclass: Caenogastropoda
- Order: Neogastropoda
- Superfamily: Conoidea
- Family: Pseudomelatomidae
- Genus: Cheungbeia; Taylor & Wells, 1994

Type species
- Pleurotoma mindanensis E. A. Smith, 1877

Species
- See text

= Cheungbeia =

Genus of gastropods

Cheungbeia is a genus of sea snails, marine gastropod mollusks in the family Pseudomelatomidae.

== Species ==
Species within the genus Cheungbeia include:

- Cheungbeia kawamurai (Habe & Kosuge, 1966)
- Cheungbeia laterculata (G. B. Sowerby II, 1870)
- Cheungbeia mindanensis (Smith E. A., 1877)
- Cheungbeia robusta (Hinds, 1843)
