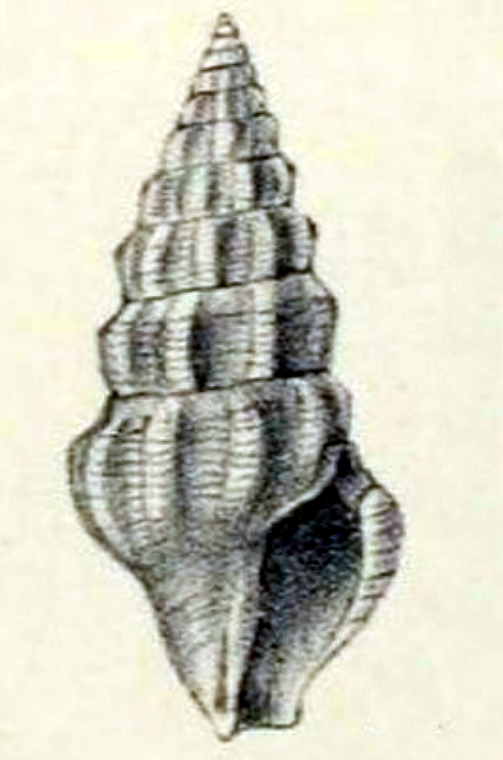
- Drawing of a shell of Funa theoreta

Scientific classification
- Kingdom: Animalia
- Phylum: Mollusca
- Class: Gastropoda
- Subclass: Caenogastropoda
- Order: Neogastropoda
- Superfamily: Conoidea
- Family: Pseudomelatomidae
- Genus: Funa
- Species: F. theoreta

Binomial name
- Funa theoreta (Melvill, 1899)

Synonyms
- Drillia theoreta Melvill, 1899

= Funa theoreta =

Species of gastropod

Funa theoreta is a species of sea snail, a marine gastropod mollusk in the family Pseudomelatomidae, the turrids and allies.

== Description ==
The length of the shell varies between 15 mm and 22 mm.

(Original description) The fusiform shell contains ten to eleven whorls, the apical 1½ whorls being glassy and globular, the remainder are strongly longitudinally ribbed. The ribs number ten round the body whorl. The aperture is ovate-oblong, within purplish fuscous. The outer lip is not much thickened. The sinus is wide. The columella is straight. The siphonal canal is shortly produced.

The several examples show no variation in sculpture, but some in coloration and size. The albino variety is smaller and unicolorous, being of a pale ochreous externally, with white aperture. The normal state exhibits a purplish suffusion both externally and within, and scattered dots and maculations along the spiral lirae which surround the shell, especially prominent on the ribs of the body whorl.

== Distribution ==
This marine species occurs in the Arabian Sea and in the Persian Gulf
