= Ptychobela minimarus =

Scientific classification
- Kingdom: Animalia
- Phylum: Mollusca
- Class: Gastropoda
- Subclass: Caenogastropoda
- Order: Neogastropoda
- Superfamily: Conoidea
- Family: Pseudomelatomidae
- Genus: Ptychobela
- Species: P. minimarus

Binomial name
- Ptychobela minimarus (Kosuge, 1993)

Synonyms
- Inquisitor minimarus Kosuge, 1993 (original combination)

Species of gastropod

Ptychobela minimarus is a species of sea snail, a marine gastropod mollusk in the family Pseudomelatomidae, the turrids and allies.

== Description ==
The length of the shell attains 14.3 mm, its diameter 4.5 mm.

== Distribution ==
This marine species is endemic to Australia and occurs off Western Australia and also found off Hainan Island, China.
