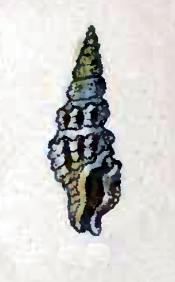
- Image of a shell of Lioglyphostoma ericea

Scientific classification
- Kingdom: Animalia
- Phylum: Mollusca
- Class: Gastropoda
- Subclass: Caenogastropoda
- Order: Neogastropoda
- Superfamily: Conoidea
- Family: Pseudomelatomidae
- Genus: Lioglyphostoma
- Species: L. ericea

Binomial name
- Lioglyphostoma ericea (Hinds, 1843)

Synonyms
- Clavatula ericea Hinds, 1843; Lioglyphostoma sirena Dall, 1919; Mangilia ericea Hinds, 1843

= Lioglyphostoma ericea =

Species of gastropod

Lioglyphostoma ericea is a species of sea snail, a marine gastropod mollusk in the family Pseudomelatomidae, the turrids and allies.

== Description ==
The length of the shell varies between 12 mm and 15 mm.

The light brown shell is slightly shouldered. The ribs continue to the sutures, nodulous below the shoulder, by the crossing of revolving lines.

== Distribution ==
This marine species occurs in the Pacific Ocean off Panama, Costa Rica and the Galapagos Islands; also off the Angel de La Guarda Island, Gulf of California; off Isla Smith, Bahia de los Angeles, Baja California, Mexico.
