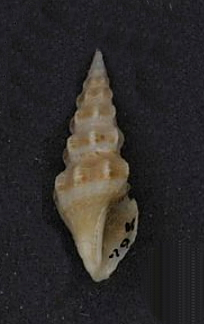
- Shell of Funa tayloriana (specimen at Naturalis Biodiversity Center)

Scientific classification
- Kingdom: Animalia
- Phylum: Mollusca
- Class: Gastropoda
- Subclass: Caenogastropoda
- Order: Neogastropoda
- Superfamily: Conoidea
- Family: Pseudomelatomidae
- Genus: Funa
- Species: F. tayloriana

Binomial name
- Funa tayloriana (Reeve, 1846)

Synonyms
- Drillia tayloriana (Reeve, 1846); Drillia topaza J.C. Melvill & R. Standen, 1901; Inquisitor taylorianus (Reeve, 1846); Pleurotoma tayloriana Reeve, 1846; Pleurotoma (Drillia) crenularis var. tayloriana Reeve, 1846; Turris (Inquisitor) tayloriana (Reeve, 1846)

= Funa tayloriana =

Species of gastropod

Funa tayloriana is a species of sea snail, a marine gastropod mollusk in the family Pseudomelatomidae, the turrids and allies.

== Description ==
The length of the shell varies between 25 mm and 40 mm.

== Distribution ==
This marine species occurs off Mozambique and in the Indo-Pacific.
