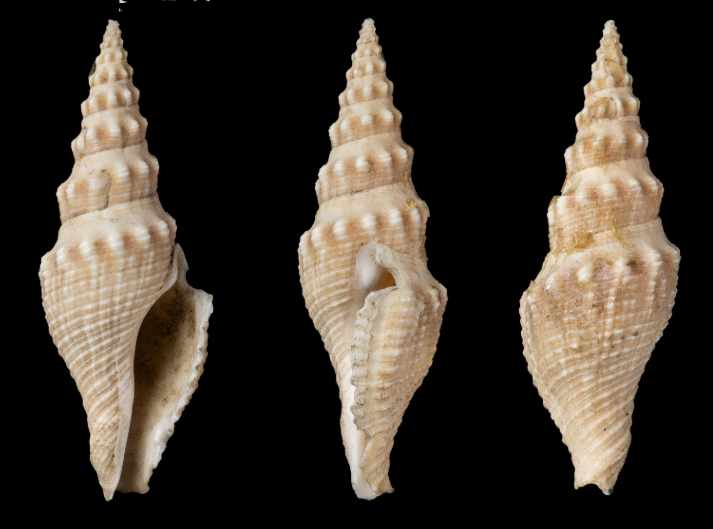
- Shell of Ptychobela griffithii (holotype at the Natural History Museum, London)

Scientific classification
- Kingdom: Animalia
- Phylum: Mollusca
- Class: Gastropoda
- Subclass: Caenogastropoda
- Order: Neogastropoda
- Superfamily: Conoidea
- Family: Pseudomelatomidae
- Genus: Ptychobela
- Species: P. griffithii

Binomial name
- Ptychobela griffithii (Gray in Griffith & Pidgeon, 1834)

Synonyms
- Clavatula griffithii Gray, 1834; Pleurotoma (Drillia) griffithii (Gray, 1834)

= Ptychobela griffithii =

Species of gastropod

Ptychobela griffithii is a species of sea snail, a marine gastropod mollusk in the family Pseudomelatomidae, the turrids.

Subspecies

- Ptychobela griffithii gracilior (Von Martens, 1904)

== Description ==
The length of the shell varies between 30 mm and 50 mm.

The small, solid shell has a fusiform shape. When the ribs and the smooth spiral lirae come together, they create axial nodes on the shoulder of each whorl. The depressed sutures lack a subsutural cord. The rather wide, slightly concave aperture measures about half the total length of the shell. The wide siphonal canal is moderately long. The outer lip is somewhat thickened. The ground color of the shell is brown with white axial nodes.

== Distribution ==
This marine species occurs in the Red Sea, off Oman, in the Bay of Bengal and off Japan.
