= Lioglyphostoma hendersoni =

Scientific classification
- Kingdom: Animalia
- Phylum: Mollusca
- Class: Gastropoda
- Subclass: Caenogastropoda
- Order: Neogastropoda
- Superfamily: Conoidea
- Family: Pseudomelatomidae
- Genus: Lioglyphostoma
- Species: L. hendersoni

Binomial name
- Lioglyphostoma hendersoni (Bartsch, 1934)

Synonyms
- Glyphostoma (Glyphostomops) hendersoni Bartsch, 1934

Species of gastropod

Lioglyphostoma hendersoni is a species of sea snail, a marine gastropod mollusk in the family Pseudomelatomidae, the turrids and allies.

== Description ==
The length of the shell varies between 8 mm and 12.5 mm.

== Distribution ==
This marine species occurs off North Carolina, United States to Mexico; also off East Brazil
