= Ptychobela dancei =

Scientific classification
- Kingdom: Animalia
- Phylum: Mollusca
- Class: Gastropoda
- Subclass: Caenogastropoda
- Order: Neogastropoda
- Superfamily: Conoidea
- Family: Pseudomelatomidae
- Genus: Ptychobela
- Species: P. dancei

Binomial name
- Ptychobela dancei Kilburn & Dekker, 2008

Species of gastropod

Ptychobela dancei is a species of sea snail, a marine gastropod mollusk in the family Pseudomelatomidae, the turrids and allies.

== Description ==
The length of the shell attains 21 mm.

== Distribution ==
This species occurs in the Indian Ocean off Oman and Somalia.
