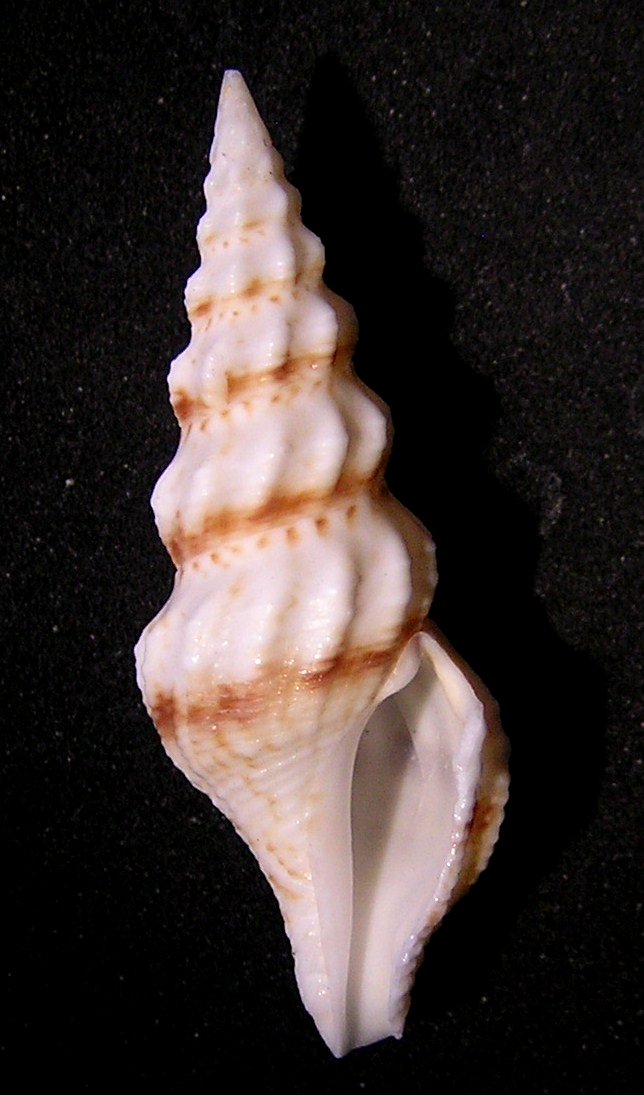
- Shell of Cheungbeia mindanensis

Scientific classification
- Kingdom: Animalia
- Phylum: Mollusca
- Class: Gastropoda
- Subclass: Caenogastropoda
- Order: Neogastropoda
- Superfamily: Conoidea
- Family: Pseudomelatomidae
- Genus: Cheungbeia
- Species: C. mindanensis

Binomial name
- Cheungbeia mindanensis (E.A. Smith, 1877)

Synonyms
- Pleurotoma (Drillia) mindanensis E. A. Smith, 1877 (basionym); Pleurotoma mindanensis E.A. Smith, 1877 (original combination)

= Cheungbeia mindanensis =

Species of gastropod

Cheungbeia mindanensis, common name the Kawamura's turrid, is a species of sea snail, a marine gastropod mollusk in the family Pseudomelatomidae, the turrids and allies.

== Description ==
The length of the shell attains 40 mm.

The elongate, ovate-fusiform shell is turreted. The dark white shell has a red band around the suture. It contains 12 whorls of which three, smooth and convex whorls in the protoconch. The consequent whorls protrude slightly, angular in the middle and slightly concave below. The ribs (13 in the penultimate whorls but becoming obsolete towards the base) in this species are flexuous and very oblique and continuous up the spire. But whether this latter be a constant character the author cannot say, as but a single example is at hand. The obtuse angulation of the body whorl at the periphery gives it a squarish aspect. The length of the aperture measures 3/7 of the total length. The outer lip is sharp and crenate at the margin. The columella is slightly twisted and tubercled at the top. The siphonal canal is slightly recurved.

== Distribution ==
This marine species occurs off the Philippines, Vietnam and Taiwan.
