= Miraclathurella herminea =

Scientific classification
- Kingdom: Animalia
- Phylum: Mollusca
- Class: Gastropoda
- Subclass: Caenogastropoda
- Order: Neogastropoda
- Superfamily: Conoidea
- Family: Pseudomelatomidae
- Genus: Miraclathurella
- Species: M. herminea

Binomial name
- Miraclathurella herminea (Bartsch, 1934)

Synonyms
- Glyphostoma (Glyphostoma) herminea Bartsch, 1934

Species of gastropod

Miraclathurella herminea is a species of sea snail, a marine gastropod mollusk in the family Pseudomelatomidae, the turrids.

== Description ==
The length of the shell varies between 12 mm and 21 mm.

== Distribution ==
This species occurs off West Florida, United States to Eastern Brazil.
