= Funa fraterculus =

Scientific classification
- Kingdom: Animalia
- Phylum: Mollusca
- Class: Gastropoda
- Subclass: Caenogastropoda
- Order: Neogastropoda
- Superfamily: Conoidea
- Family: Pseudomelatomidae
- Genus: Funa
- Species: F. fraterculus

Binomial name
- Funa fraterculus Kilburn, 1988

Species of gastropod

Funa fraterculus is a species of sea snail, a marine gastropod mollusk in the family Pseudomelatomidae, the turrids and allies.

== Description ==
The length of the shell attains 19 mm.

== Distribution ==
This marine species occurs in the Mozambique Channel.
