= Darrylia harryleei =

Scientific classification
- Kingdom: Animalia
- Phylum: Mollusca
- Class: Gastropoda
- Subclass: Caenogastropoda
- Order: Neogastropoda
- Superfamily: Conoidea
- Family: Horaiclavidae
- Genus: Darrylia
- Species: D. harryleei

Binomial name
- Darrylia harryleei García, 2008

Species of gastropod

Darrylia harryleei is a species of sea snail, a marine gastropod mollusk in the family Horaiclavidae.

It was previously included within the subfamily Crassispirinae, Turridae.

== Description ==
The length of the shell varies between 5.9 mm and 7.7 mm.

== Distribution ==
This marine species occurs in the Caribbean Sea off Honduras.
