= Lioglyphostoma acrocarinatum =

Scientific classification
- Kingdom: Animalia
- Phylum: Mollusca
- Class: Gastropoda
- Subclass: Caenogastropoda
- Order: Neogastropoda
- Superfamily: Conoidea
- Family: Pseudomelatomidae
- Genus: Lioglyphostoma
- Species: L. acrocarinatum

Binomial name
- Lioglyphostoma acrocarinatum (W. H. Dall, 1927)

Synonyms
- Mangilia acrocarinata W. H. Dall, 1927

Species of gastropod

Lioglyphostoma acrocarinatum is a species of sea snail, a marine gastropod mollusk in the family Pseudomelatomidae, the turrids and allies.

== Description ==
The length of the shell attains 6.5 mm, its diameter 2.7 mm.

(Original description) The small, acute shell is pale brown when fresh, with a short sharply unicarinate protoconch of two whorls, and six subsequent whorls. The suture is distinct and appressed. The anal sulcus is shallow and rounded. The fasciole extends between the suture and the shoulder of the whorl, flattish and smooth except for incremental lines. The axial sculpture consists of (on the body whorl 10) extremely short ribs which appear chiefly as pointed nodules on a peripheral minute keel and again as faint pustules on a thread near the margin of the base; with wider interspaces. The spiral sculpture consists of the above-mentioned thread and keel, and a few fine close threads on the short siphonal canal . tTe general surface of the shell is polished with a waxy luster. The base of the shell is flattish. The aperture is ovate and short. The siphonal canal is wide. The columella is attenuated in front, its axis impervious.

== Distribution ==
This marine species occurs in the Atlantic Ocean off Georgia to Florida, United States.
