= Darrylia kleinrosa =

Scientific classification
- Kingdom: Animalia
- Phylum: Mollusca
- Class: Gastropoda
- Subclass: Caenogastropoda
- Order: Neogastropoda
- Superfamily: Conoidea
- Family: Horaiclavidae
- Genus: Darrylia
- Species: D. kleinrosa

Binomial name
- Darrylia kleinrosa (Nowell-Usticke, 1969)

Synonyms
- Drillia kleinrosa Nowell-Usticke, 1969; Miraclathurella kleinrosa (Nowell-Usticke, 1969)

Species of gastropod

Darrylia kleinrosa is a species of sea snail, a marine gastropod mollusc in the family Horaiclavidae.

According to Garcia (2008), this species belongs in Darrylia and not in Miraclathurella (as proposed by DeJong & Coomans, 1988).

== Description ==
The length of the shell attains 8.5 mm (0.33 in).

== Distribution ==
This species occurs in the Caribbean Sea off Aruba, Bonaire and Curaçao.
