= Miraclathurella mendozana =

Scientific classification
- Kingdom: Animalia
- Phylum: Mollusca
- Class: Gastropoda
- Subclass: Caenogastropoda
- Order: Neogastropoda
- Superfamily: Conoidea
- Family: Pseudomelatomidae
- Genus: Miraclathurella
- Species: M. mendozana

Binomial name
- Miraclathurella mendozana Shasky, 1971

Species of gastropod

Miraclathurella mendozana is a species of sea snail, a marine gastropod mollusk in the family Pseudomelatomidae, the turrids.

== Distribution ==
This species occurs in the Pacific Ocean from Mexico to Panama.
