= Lioglyphostoma tenuata =

Scientific classification
- Kingdom: Animalia
- Phylum: Mollusca
- Class: Gastropoda
- Subclass: Caenogastropoda
- Order: Neogastropoda
- Superfamily: Conoidea
- Family: Pseudomelatomidae
- Genus: Lioglyphostoma
- Species: L. tenuata

Binomial name
- Lioglyphostoma tenuata F.S. MacNeil, 1960

Extinct species of gastropod

Lioglyphostoma tenuata is an extinct species of sea snail, a marine gastropod mollusk in the family Pseudomelatomidae, the turrids and allies.

== Description ==
The length of the shell attains 12.4 mm; its diameter is 3.7 mm.

== Distribution ==
Fossils have been found in Miocene and Pliocene strata of Okinawa, Japan.
