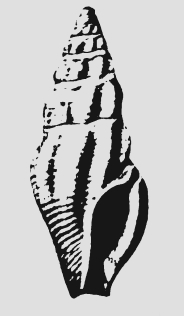
- Original image of a shell of Lioglyphostoma tyro

Scientific classification
- Kingdom: Animalia
- Phylum: Mollusca
- Class: Gastropoda
- Subclass: Caenogastropoda
- Order: Neogastropoda
- Superfamily: Conoidea
- Family: Pseudomelatomidae
- Genus: Lioglyphostoma
- Species: L. tyro

Binomial name
- Lioglyphostoma tyro J. Gardner, 1937

= Lioglyphostoma tyro =

Extinct species of gastropod

Lioglyphostoma rusum is an extinct species of sea snail, a marine gastropod mollusk in the family Pseudomelatomidae, the turrids and allies.

== Description ==
The length of the shell attains 8 mm, its diameter 3.1 mm.

(Original description) The small, slender shell is smoothly rounded, fusiform in the apertural view, the maximum diameter falling in front of the median horizontal. The aperture is almost half as high as the entire shell. The whorls of the spire are strongly appressed posteriorly but scarcely constricted, increasing slowly in diameter. The body whorl is attenuated and gradually tapering to the rather broad anterior extremity. The spire contains 5 whorls. The protoconch is entirely smooth, highly polished, a little more than thrice coiled. The initial whorl is minute, almost entirely submerged, the succeeding volutions feebly inflated, increasing rather rapidly in altitude and diameter. The dividing line between the spire and the protoconch is indicated by an irregular thickening of the shell, the appression of the posterior portion of the whorl, and the initiation of the axial and spiral ornamentation. The axial ribs are narrow, more persistent posteriorly and more strongly protractive upon the early whorls, rather broadly rounded, continuing with scarcely diminished strength to the anterior suture and to the base of the body, obsolete upon the appressed posterior margin. Nine ribs upon the later whorls of the spire, including the body, which is regularly costate except for the nearly terminal varix and the relatively feeble rib behind it The intercostal areas are somewhat flattened and of approximately the same width as the costals. The spiral sculpture is very low and inconspicuous, 6 extremely low, flattened lirae developed on the body whorl of the spire and about twice as many upon the body, not including the columella. The interspaces are as wide or a little wider than the lirae, microscopically striated with 2 to 5 crowded spirals The columella is girded with about half a dozen less feeble lirae separated by narrow, striated interspaces. The anterior fasciole is also threaded with 6 more rounded and more closely spaced lira. The posterior margin is closely appressed, feebly elevated, beveled, and spirally striated like the rest of the fasciole. The suture is distinct and feebly impressed. The aperture is narrow, obliquely oblanceolate and open at both extremities. The outer lip is feebly expanded axially, rather strongly incrementally, varicose behind the margin, the margin itself thin, sharp, and finely crenulated, smooth within. The pPosterior sinus is very deep, contracted at the entrance. The outer lip us feebly emarginate also at the base of the body, possibly for the extension of the eye stalks. The inner margin of the aperture is smoothly concave. The parietal wash is thin except for a heavy local deposit at the posterior entrance to the sinus. The columella is rather long, straight, reinforced. The anterior canal is short, flaring a little, contracted by the axial thickening on the inner surface of the outer lip. The anterior fasciole is rather narrow, broadly emarginate at its extremity.

== Distribution ==
Fossils have been found in Miocene strata of the Chipola Formation in Florida, United States.
