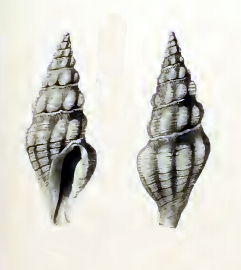
- Original image of a shell of Brachytoma rufolineata

Scientific classification
- Kingdom: Animalia
- Phylum: Mollusca
- Class: Gastropoda
- Subclass: Caenogastropoda
- Order: Neogastropoda
- Superfamily: Conoidea
- Family: Pseudomelatomidae
- Genus: Brachytoma
- Species: B. rufolineata

Binomial name
- Brachytoma rufolineata (Schepman, 1913)

Synonyms
- Drillia rufolineata Schepman, 1913

= Brachytoma rufolineata =

Species of gastropod

Brachytoma rufolineata is a species of sea snail, a marine gastropod mollusk in the family Pseudomelatomidae.

== Description ==
The length of the shell attains 16.5 mm, its diameter 5¾ mm.

(Original description) The strong shell is broadly fusiform It is yellowish, painted and spirally lineated with red-brown. It contains nine whorls, of which about 2 form a smooth protoconch. The post-nuclear whorls are convex, with an undulated suture, accompanied by a subsutural rib or keel, below this a slight excavation. The convexly rounded whorls have scarcely a tendency to be angular below the excavation The sculpture consists of strong rounded ribs, crossing, though less distinctly, the excavation, 10 in number on the body whorl, where they nearly reach the base. There is one rib at some distance from the peristome, just behind the upper sinus, especially strong and varix-like. The brown colour consists of. a faint tinge in the excavation. A similar zone exists below the periphery, much more conspicuous between the ribs, the principal lirae being nearly without exception red-brown, especially 4 of them on the body whorl. The spirals number from 3 to 7 on upper whorls and numerous ones on the body whorl and siphonal canal, which cannot be divided into principal and secondary ones. The excavation is finely spirally striated, moreover very fine growth-lirae are visible in many parts, if seen with a strong lens. The aperture is elongately oval, with a broad, moderately deep sinus below the suture. The peristome is rather thin, with a very shallow sinus near the siphonal canal, which is short and broad. The columellar margin is tubercled above, then slightly concave, then straight and slightly directed to the left at the siphonal canal, strongly enamelled in its whole length. The interior of the aperture is light purplish, nearly white near the peristome.

== Distribution ==
The marine species occurs off the Philippines and in the Sulu Archipel.
