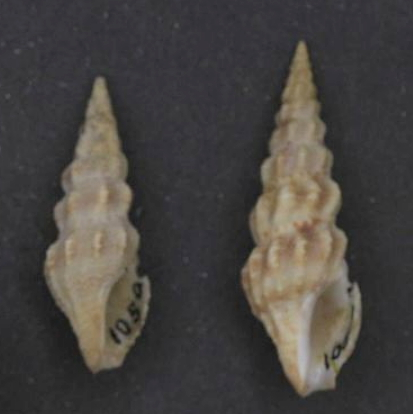
- Shell of Inquisitor variabilis (specimen at Naturalis Biodiversity Center)

Scientific classification
- Kingdom: Animalia
- Phylum: Mollusca
- Class: Gastropoda
- Subclass: Caenogastropoda
- Order: Neogastropoda
- Superfamily: Conoidea
- Family: Pseudomelatomidae
- Genus: Funa
- Species: F. variabilis

Binomial name
- Funa variabilis (E. A. Smith, 1877)

Synonyms
- Drillia variabilis (E. A. Smith, 1877); Inquisitor variabilis (E. A. Smith, 1877); Pleurotoma variabilis E. A. Smith, 1877

= Funa variabilis =

Species of gastropod

Funa variabilis is a species of sea snail, a marine gastropod mollusk in the family Pseudomelatomidae, the turrids and allies.

== Description ==
The shell is yellowish brown, sometimes irregularly maculated with chestnut, with chestnut spots on a narrow band below the suture. The spire is long and turreted. It is slightly umbilicated. The large sinus is ascending.

== Distribution ==
This marine species occurs off the Andaman Islands.
