= Lioglyphostoma rectilabrum =

Scientific classification
- Kingdom: Animalia
- Phylum: Mollusca
- Class: Gastropoda
- Subclass: Caenogastropoda
- Order: Neogastropoda
- Superfamily: Conoidea
- Family: Pseudomelatomidae
- Genus: Lioglyphostoma
- Species: L. rectilabrum

Binomial name
- Lioglyphostoma rectilabrum McLean & Poorman, 1971

Species of gastropod

Lioglyphostoma rectilabrum is a species of sea snail, a marine gastropod mollusk in the family Pseudomelatomidae, the turrids and allies.
