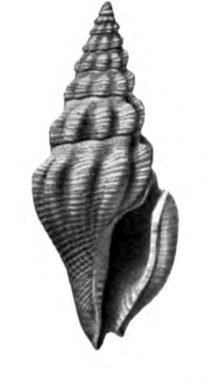
- Original image of a shell of Lioglyphostoma rusum

Scientific classification
- Kingdom: Animalia
- Phylum: Mollusca
- Class: Gastropoda
- Subclass: Caenogastropoda
- Order: Neogastropoda
- Superfamily: Conoidea
- Family: Pseudomelatomidae
- Genus: Lioglyphostoma
- Species: L. rusum

Binomial name
- Lioglyphostoma rusum J. Gardner, 1937

= Lioglyphostoma rusum =

Extinct species of sea snail

Lioglyphostoma rusum is an extinct species of sea snail, a marine gastropod mollusk in the family Pseudomelatomidae, the turrids and allies.

== Description ==
The length of the shell attains 14.7 mm, its diameter 6 mm.

(Original description) The hell is of moderate size for the group. The spire is elevated and turreted. The body is rather sharply constricted into the long and slender columella. The aperture is about half the entire altitude, maximum diameter a little less. The shell contains 7 whorls. The protoconch is rather slender but elevated, thrice coiled. The initial whorl is tumid, tilted, and immersed at the tip. The second whorl is convex at its beginning, becoming increasingly angulated toward its close. The area behind the periphery is broadly and steeply sloping, the much narrower portion in front of it undercut. The periphery is a little less strongly anterior on the final turn and crowned with a flattened spiral. A second similar liration is intercalated directly behind the anterior suture. The dividing line between the spire and the protoconch is indicated by the introduction of the axial sculpture. The axials are sharply rounded and persist with diminished strength upon the early whorls to the posterior suture, broader but abruptly elevated and strongly rounded upon the later, 10 upon the penultimate whorl, irregular upon the last half of the body whorl, a little more elevated medially than anteriorly, and more or less completely evanescent posteriorly and upon the base of the body. The intercostal areas are strongly concave and of approximately the same width as the costals. The spiral sculpture is equally developed upon the axial and interaxial areas, the primaries carried across from the protoconch, 2 on the earliest whorl, increasing to 3 on the second or third volutions, and to 4 on the penultimate whorl. Secondaries commonly are intercalated. There are 14 additional primaries without intercalated secondaries upon the body whorl and the columella, the lirae a little more sharply defined and less closely spaced anteriorly. The anterior fasciole is closely threaded with about a dozen rounded lirae. The posterior fasciole is lineated with sharp filaments, 8 in the type. The fasciole is defined by the constriction of the whorl, the abruptly diminished axials, and the equally abrupt change in the character of the spirals. Incrementals are strongly arcuate upon the fasciole and commonly rather vigorous. The posterior margin is very closely appressed against the preceding whorl and creeping up a little upon it, undulated in harmony with the axials of the preceding volution. The suture line is distinct, impressed and undulatory. The aperture is obliquely lenticular, open at both extremities. The outer lip is arcuate, varicated a little behind the margin, the edge thin, sharp, and finely crenulated. The inner surface of the outer lip is thickened directly in front of the posterior sinus, irregularly lirated, normal to the margin in the anterior third, feebly reinforced parallel to the anterior canal. The posterior sinus is very broad and deep, slightly constricted at the entrance, symmetrically disposed between the suture and the outer margin of the fasciole. The inner margin of the aperture is excavated at the base of the body. The parietal glaze is for the most part so thin that the spiral sculpture may be traced through it but very heavy near the entrance to the sinus. The columella is also rather heavily reinforced and rudely denticulated. The anterior canal is moderately long for the group and rather narrow, flaring at its extremity. The anterior fasciole is wide and deeply emarginate.

== Distribution ==
Fossils have been found in Miocene strata of the Alum Bluff Formation in Florida, United States.
