= Darrylia =

Scientific classification
- Kingdom: Animalia
- Phylum: Mollusca
- Class: Gastropoda
- Subclass: Caenogastropoda
- Order: Neogastropoda
- Superfamily: Conoidea
- Family: Horaiclavidae
- Genus: Darrylia; García, 2008

Type species
- Darrylia harryleei García, 2008

Species
- See text

Genus of gastropods

Darrylia is a genus of sea snails, marine gastropod mollusks in the family Horaiclavidae.

It was previously included tentatively within the subfamily Crassispirinae of the family Turridae.

== Description ==
Species in this genus show a broad protoconch with 1.5 whorls and without spiral ornamentation. The claviform shell contains strong axial ribs, crossed by narrower spiral cords, and lacks a sutural cord. The elongate-ovate aperture measures about a third of the total length of the shell. The lip shows a strong varix.

== Species ==
Species within the genus Darrylia include:

- Darrylia abdita Espinosa & Ortea, 2018
- Darrylia bizantina Espinosa & Ortea, 2018
- Darrylia clendenini (García, 2008)
- Darrylia harryleei García, 2008
- Darrylia kleinrosa (Usticke, 1969) (synonyms: Miraclathurella kleinrosa (Nowell-Usticke, 1969); Drillia kleinrosa Nowell-Usticke, 1969)
- Darrylia maisiana Espinosa & Ortea, 2018
- Darrylia peggywilliamsae (Fallon, 2010)
