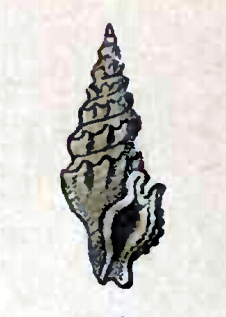
- Drawing of a shell of Cheungbeia robusta

Scientific classification
- Kingdom: Animalia
- Phylum: Mollusca
- Class: Gastropoda
- Subclass: Caenogastropoda
- Order: Neogastropoda
- Superfamily: Conoidea
- Family: Pseudomelatomidae
- Genus: Cheungbeia
- Species: C. robusta

Binomial name
- Cheungbeia robusta (Hinds, 1843)

Synonyms
- Clavatula robusta Hinds, 1843; Drillia robusta (Hinds, 1843)

= Cheungbeia robusta =

Species of gastropod

Cheungbeia robusta is a species of sea snail, a marine gastropod mollusk in the family Pseudomelatomidae, the turrids and allies

== Description ==
The length of the shell attains 19 mm.

The whorls of the yellowish white shell are strongly turreted. The spire is exserted. The periphery is angulated and nodulous, with fine revolving striae. The large sinus is produced.

== Distribution ==
This species occurs in the South China Sea.
