= Lioglyphostoma chinenensis =

Scientific classification
- Kingdom: Animalia
- Phylum: Mollusca
- Class: Gastropoda
- Subclass: Caenogastropoda
- Order: Neogastropoda
- Superfamily: Conoidea
- Family: Pseudomelatomidae
- Genus: Lioglyphostoma
- Species: L. chinenensis

Binomial name
- Lioglyphostoma chinenensis F.S. MacNeil, 1960

Extinct species of gastropod

Lioglyphostoma chinenensis is an extinct species of sea snail, a marine gastropod mollusk in the family Pseudomelatomidae, the turrids and allies.

== Description ==
The length of the shell attains 11.4 mm; its diameter 3.7 mm.

== Distribution ==
Fossils have been found in Pliocene strata of Okinawa, Japan.
