= Miraclathurella entemma =

Scientific classification
- Kingdom: Animalia
- Phylum: Mollusca
- Class: Gastropoda
- Subclass: Caenogastropoda
- Order: Neogastropoda
- Superfamily: Conoidea
- Family: Pseudomelatomidae
- Genus: Miraclathurella
- Species: M. entemma

Binomial name
- Miraclathurella entemma (Woodring 1928)

Synonyms
- † Euclathurella (Miraclathurella) entemma Woodring, 1928

Extinct species of gastropod

Miraclathurella entemma is an extinct species of sea snail, a marine gastropod mollusk in the family Pseudomelatomidae, the turrids and allies.

== Distribution ==
Fossils of this species were found in Miocene strata in the Bowden Formation, Jamaica.
