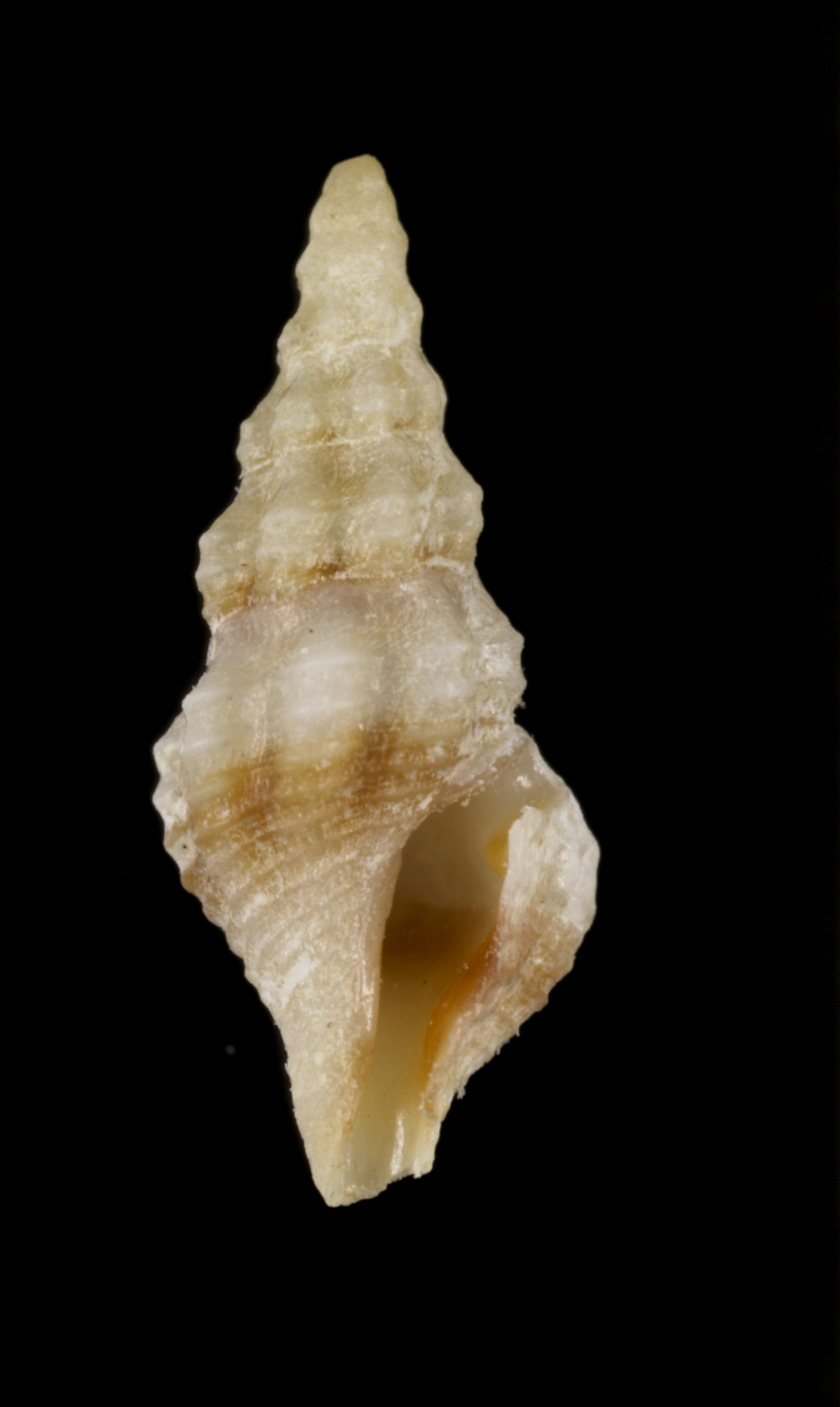
- Shell of Lioglyphostoma adematum (specimen at MNHN, Paris)

Scientific classification
- Kingdom: Animalia
- Phylum: Mollusca
- Class: Gastropoda
- Subclass: Caenogastropoda
- Order: Neogastropoda
- Superfamily: Conoidea
- Family: Pseudomelatomidae
- Genus: Lioglyphostoma
- Species: L. adematum

Binomial name
- Lioglyphostoma adematum Woodring, 1928

= Lioglyphostoma adematum =

Species of gastropod

Lioglyphostoma adematum is a species of sea snail, a marine gastropod mollusk in the family Pseudomelatomidae, the turrids and allies.

== Description ==
The length of the shell varies between 7–10 mm (0.28–0.39 in).

== Distribution ==
This marine species occurs off Guadeloupe and in the Atlantic Ocean off Northern Brazil; fossils have been found in Pliocene strata of the Bowden Formation, Jamaica; age range: 3.6 to 2.588 Ma.
