= Lioglyphostoma antillarum =

Scientific classification
- Kingdom: Animalia
- Phylum: Mollusca
- Class: Gastropoda
- Subclass: Caenogastropoda
- Order: Neogastropoda
- Superfamily: Conoidea
- Family: Pseudomelatomidae
- Genus: Lioglyphostoma
- Species: L. antillarum

Binomial name
- Lioglyphostoma antillarum (d'Orbigny, 1842)

Synonyms
- Pleurotoma antillarum Orbigny, 1842

Species of mollusc

Lioglyphostoma antillarum is a species of sea snail, a marine gastropod mollusk in the family Pseudomelatomidae, the turrids and their allies.

== Description ==
The length of the shell varies between 6 mm and 12 mm.

== Distribution ==
This marine species occurs in the West Indies; also on the Mid-Atlantic Ridge.
