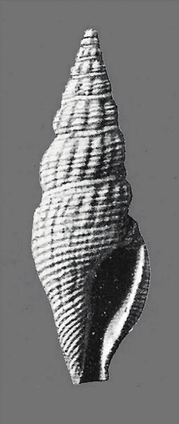

Scientific classification
- Kingdom: Animalia
- Phylum: Mollusca
- Class: Gastropoda
- Subclass: Caenogastropoda
- Order: Neogastropoda
- Superfamily: Conoidea
- Family: Pseudomelatomidae
- Genus: Miraclathurella
- Species: M. vittata

Binomial name
- Miraclathurella vittata (Woodring 1928)

Synonyms
- † Euclathurella (Miraclathurella) entemma Woodring, 1928

= Miraclathurella vittata =

Extinct species of gastropod

Miraclathurella vittata is an extinct Pliocene species of sea snail, a marine gastropod mollusk in the family Pseudomelatomidae, the turrids and allies. The species was discovered by Wendell Woodring in 1928.

== Description ==
The length of the shell attains 12 mm, its diameter 4.1 mm. Woodring described the genus Miraclathurella and identified two species. M. vittata was differentiated from M. entemna by a "protoconch of about three whorls, about the last half whorl bearing an anterior keel, behind which lie axial riblets.”

== Distribution ==
Fossils of this species were found in Miocene strata in the Bowden Formation, Jamaica; age range: 3.6 to 2.588 Ma.
