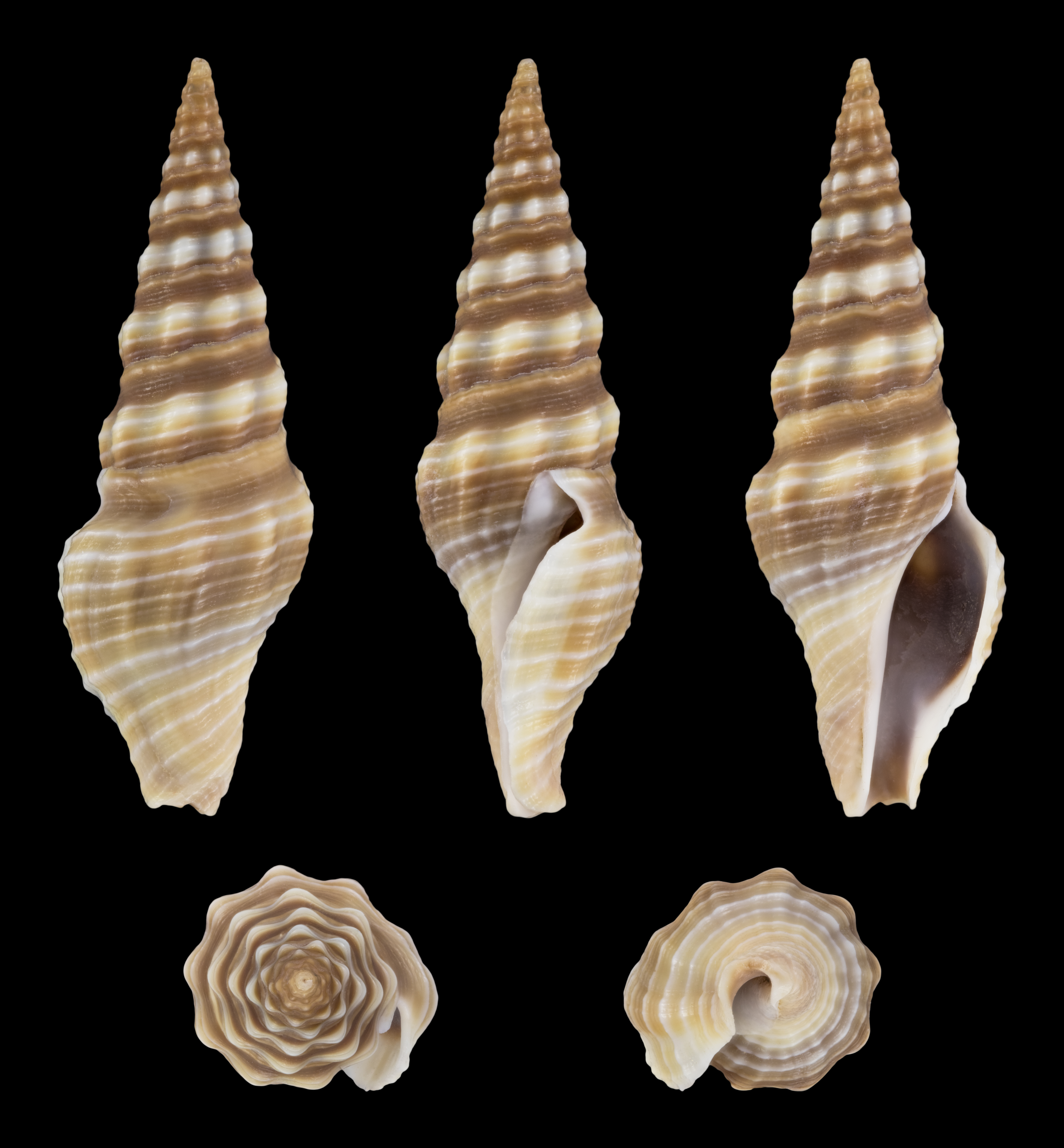
- A shell of Ptychobela vexillium

Scientific classification
- Kingdom: Animalia
- Phylum: Mollusca
- Class: Gastropoda
- Subclass: Caenogastropoda
- Order: Neogastropoda
- Superfamily: Conoidea
- Family: Pseudomelatomidae
- Genus: Ptychobela
- Species: P. vexillium

Binomial name
- Ptychobela vexillium (Habe & Kosuge, 1966)

Synonyms
- Brachytoma vexillum Habe & Kosuge, 1966; Inquisitor vexillium (Habe & Kosuge, 1966)

= Ptychobela vexillium =

Species of gastropod

Ptychobela vexillum is a species of sea snail, a marine gastropod mollusk in the family Pseudomelatomidae, the turrids and allies.

R.N. Kilburn proposed in 1989 Brachytoma vexillum Habe & Kosuge, 1966 as a synonym of Ptychobela suturalis (Gray, 1838)

The epithet vexillium was probably a misspelling in the original text, but was not indicated as such. Therefore, it takes priority over vexillum, published five-month later and repeated later by some authors.

== Description ==
The length of the shell attains 46.5 mm, its diameter 14.5 mm.

== Distribution ==
This marine species occurs in the South China Sea, off the Philippines and Japan; also off Australia (Northern Territory, Queensland, Western Australia).
