= Miraclathurella darwini =

Scientific classification
- Kingdom: Animalia
- Phylum: Mollusca
- Class: Gastropoda
- Subclass: Caenogastropoda
- Order: Neogastropoda
- Superfamily: Conoidea
- Family: Pseudomelatomidae
- Genus: Miraclathurella
- Species: M. darwini

Binomial name
- Miraclathurella darwini (Philippi, 1887)

Synonyms
- † Pleurotoma darwini Philippi, 1887

Extinct species of gastropod

Miraclathurella darwini is an extinct species of sea snail, a marine gastropod mollusk in the family Pseudomelatomidae, the turrids and allies.

== Description ==
M. darwini has been described as elongate-fusiform and exceeds the average size for genus Miraclathurella. The length of the shell is 21.7 mm. The shell has a tall, slender spire with whorls that are nearly horizontal relative to the upright spire. The final whorl composes approximately one third of the shell's total length and transitions into the siphonal canal. The anal sinus is moderate to deep with a broadly rounded apex and is located anterior to the suture. The structure of the shell has multiple, closely spaced narrow axial ribs cross-sectioned by spiral bands. The columella is covered by a callus deposit.

== Distribution ==
Fossils of this species were found in Miocene strata in central Chile.
