= Funa laterculoides =

Scientific classification
- Kingdom: Animalia
- Phylum: Mollusca
- Class: Gastropoda
- Subclass: Caenogastropoda
- Order: Neogastropoda
- Superfamily: Conoidea
- Family: Pseudomelatomidae
- Genus: Funa
- Species: F. laterculoides

Binomial name
- Funa laterculoides (Barnard, 1958)

Synonyms
- Drillia laterculoides Barnard, 1958 (basionym); Inquisitor laterculoides (Barnard, 1958)

Species of gastropod

Funa laterculoides is a species of sea snail, a marine gastropod mollusk in the family Pseudomelatomidae, the turrids and allies. It was first described by K. H. Barnard in 1958.

== Description ==
The shell grows to a length of 25 mm.

== Distribution ==
This species occurs off the coasts of South Africa.
