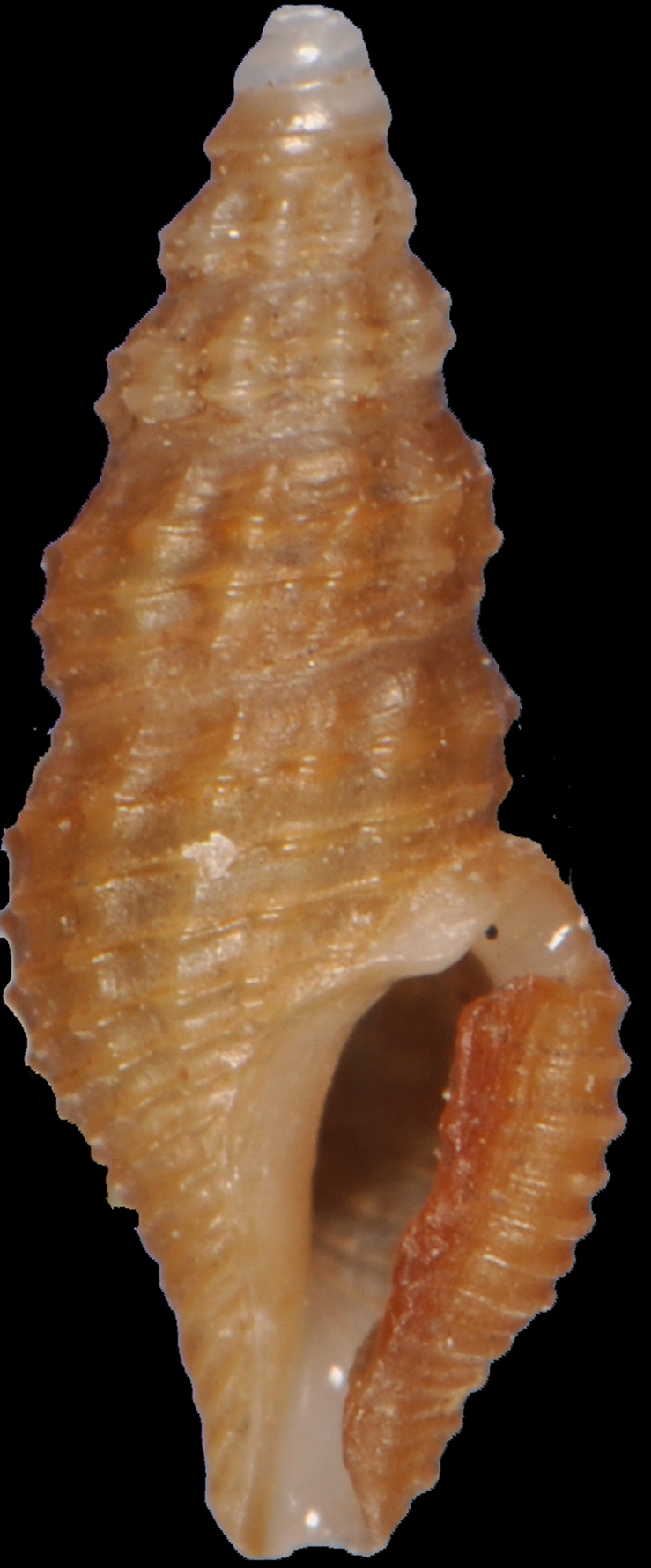
- Shell of Lioglyphostoma oenoa (specimen at MNHN, Paris)

Scientific classification
- Kingdom: Animalia
- Phylum: Mollusca
- Class: Gastropoda
- Subclass: Caenogastropoda
- Order: Neogastropoda
- Superfamily: Conoidea
- Family: Pseudomelatomidae
- Genus: Lioglyphostoma
- Species: L. oenoa

Binomial name
- Lioglyphostoma oenoa (Bartsch, 1934)

Synonyms
- Glyphostoma (Glyphostomops) oenoa Bartsch, 1934

= Lioglyphostoma oenoa =

Species of gastropod

Lioglyphostoma oenoa is a species of sea snail, a marine gastropod mollusk in the family Pseudomelatomidae, the turrids and allies.

== Description ==
The length of the shell attains 10 mm.

== Distribution ==
This marine species occurs off Florida, United States; Puerto Rico; Colombia.
