= Ptychobela sumatrensis =

Scientific classification
- Kingdom: Animalia
- Phylum: Mollusca
- Class: Gastropoda
- Subclass: Caenogastropoda
- Order: Neogastropoda
- Superfamily: Conoidea
- Family: Pseudomelatomidae
- Genus: Ptychobela
- Species: P. sumatrensis

Binomial name
- Ptychobela sumatrensis (Petit de la Saussaye, 1852)

Synonyms
- Pleurotoma sumatrense Petit de la Saussaye, 1852

Species of gastropod

Ptychobela sumatrensis is a species of sea snail, a marine gastropod mollusk in the family Pseudomelatomidae, the turrids and allies.

== Description ==
The length of the shell varies between 23 mm and 35 mm.

== Distribution ==
This marine species occurs off Sumatra, Indonesia.
