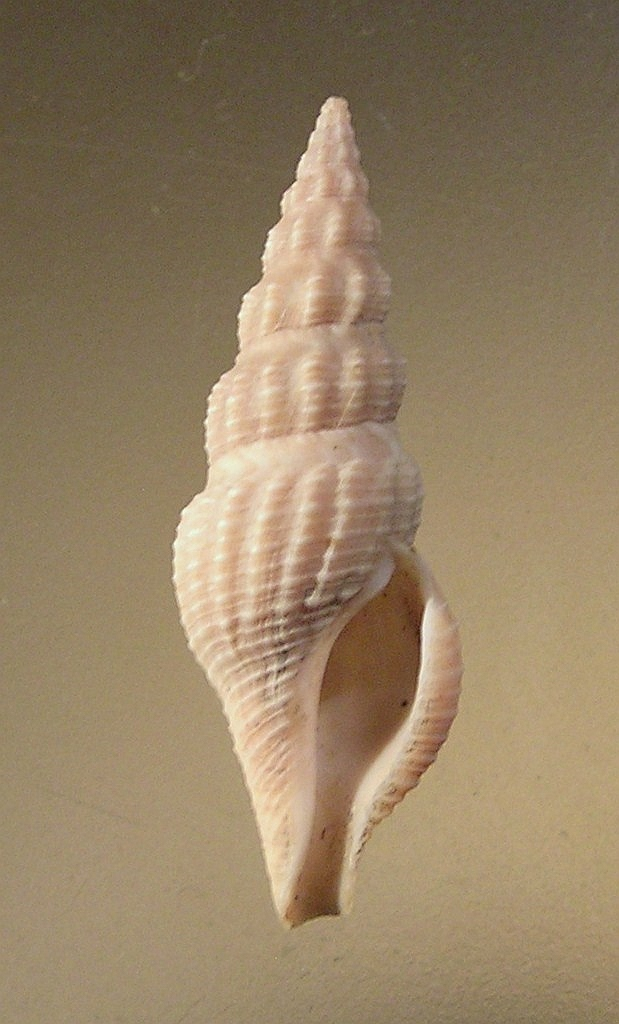
- Apertural view of Funa jeffreysii

Scientific classification
- Kingdom: Animalia
- Phylum: Mollusca
- Class: Gastropoda
- Subclass: Caenogastropoda
- Order: Neogastropoda
- Superfamily: Conoidea
- Family: Pseudomelatomidae
- Genus: Funa
- Species: F. jeffreysii

Binomial name
- Funa jeffreysii (E.A. Smith, 1875)

Synonyms
- Brachytoma zuiomaru Nomura & Hatai, 1940; Drillia jeffreysii E.A. Smith, 1875 (original combination); Drillia principalis Pilsbry, 1895; Funa zuiomaru Nomura & Hatai, 1940; Inquisitor jeffreysii (E. A. Smith, 1875)

= Funa jeffreysii =

Species of gastropod

Funa jeffreysii, common name Jeffrey's turrid, is a species of sea snail, a marine gastropod mollusk in the family Pseudomelatomidae, the turrids and allies

== Description ==
The length of the shell varies between 30 mm and 55 mm.

The shell contains about 13 whorls. These are angular convex and concave above. Its color is buff, finely mottled all over with reddish-brown, purplish on the spire, especially between the folds. It is sculptured with oblique longitudinal folds (11 on the penultimate whorl) which stop abruptly at the shoulder and gradually decrease below. The spirals are rather spaced, coarse and unequal, alternating in size, absent on the concave upper surface of the whorls. The surface between lirae and over the concave anal fasciole is finely spirally striate. The aperture is subrhombic, narrowed below, slightly over one-third the shell's length. The siphonal canal is a little recurved. The anal sinus is very deep and straight. The outer lip is arched forward, with a distinct subbasal sinus. The columella is moderately calloused and nearly straight below, bearing a callous tubercle above.

== Distribution ==
This marine species occurs off Japan, Korea, China and the Philippines.
