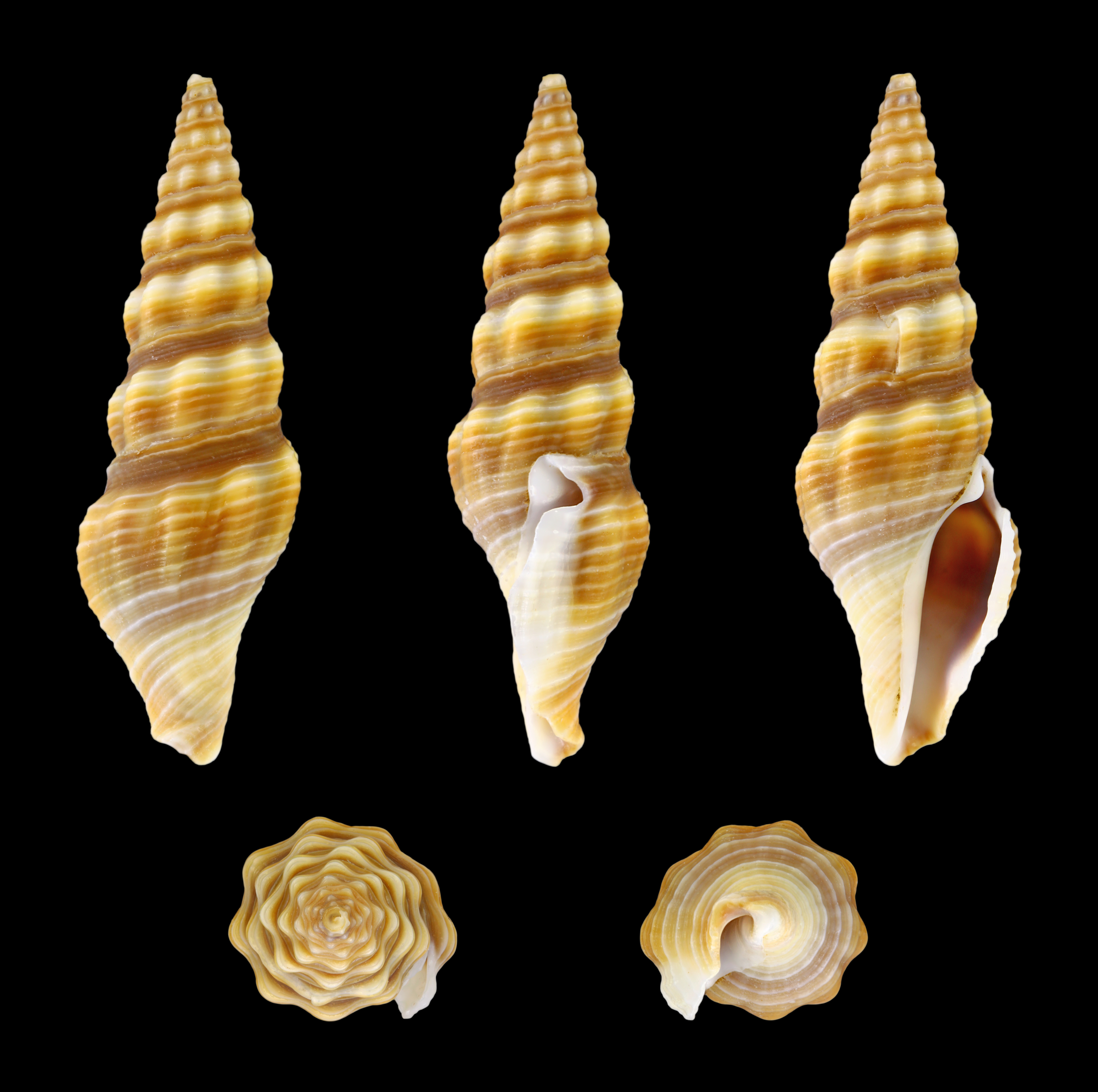
- Shells of Ptychobela nodulosa

Scientific classification
- Kingdom: Animalia
- Phylum: Mollusca
- Class: Gastropoda
- Subclass: Caenogastropoda
- Order: Neogastropoda
- Superfamily: Conoidea
- Family: Pseudomelatomidae
- Genus: Ptychobela
- Species: P. nodulosa

Binomial name
- Ptychobela nodulosa (Gmelin, 1791)

Synonyms
- Clavatula crenularis Lamarck, 1816; Drillia crenularis (Lamarck, 1816); Murex nodulosus Gmelin, 1791 (original combination); Pleurotoma (Drillia) atkinsonii E. A. Smith, 1877; Pleurotoma atkinsonii E. A. Smith, 1877; Ptychobela crenularis (Lamarck, 1816)

= Ptychobela nodulosa =

Species of gastropod

Ptychobela nodulosa is a species of sea snail, a marine gastropod mollusk in the family Pseudomelatomidae, the turrids and allies.

== Description ==
The length of the shell varies between 34 mm and 50 mm.

== Distribution ==
This marine species occurs off Western Australia, Australia, and Western India.
