= Inquisitor pseudoprincipalis =

Scientific classification
- Kingdom: Animalia
- Phylum: Mollusca
- Class: Gastropoda
- Subclass: Caenogastropoda
- Order: Neogastropoda
- Superfamily: Conoidea
- Family: Pseudomelatomidae
- Genus: Inquisitor
- Species: I. pseudoprincipalis

Binomial name
- Inquisitor pseudoprincipalis (M. Yokoyama, 1920 )

Synonyms.
- Clavus pseudoprincipalis (Yokoyama, 1920); Crassispira pseudoprincipalis (Yokoyama, 1920); Drillia pseudoprincipalis (M. Yokoyama, 1920); Inquisitor (Pseudoinquisitor) pseudoprincipalis (Yokoyama, 1920); Pleurotoma (Drillia) pseudoprincipalis Yokoyama, 1920; Ptychobela pseudoprincipalis (M. Yokoyama, 1920)

Species of gastropod

Inquisitor pseudoprincipalis is a species of sea snail, a marine gastropod mollusk in the family Pseudomelatomidae, the turrids and allies.

There seems to be confusion about the accepted name of this species. According to the University of Tokyo, the accepted name is Crassispira pseudoprincipalis, while according to the World Register of Marine Species, the accepted name is Inquisitor pseudoprincipalis. Both rely on the basionym Pleurotoma (Drillia) pseudoprincipalis Yokoyama, 1920.

== Description ==
The length of the shell attains 31.3 mm.

== Distribution ==
This marine species occurs off Vietnam and in the Yellow Sea. Fossils were found in Pliocene strata in the Naganuma Formation at Kanagawa, Japan.
