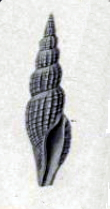
- Shell of † Miraclathurella gracilis

Scientific classification
- Kingdom: Animalia
- Phylum: Mollusca
- Class: Gastropoda
- Subclass: Caenogastropoda
- Order: Neogastropoda
- Superfamily: Conoidea
- Family: Pseudomelatomidae
- Genus: Miraclathurella
- Species: M. gracilis

Binomial name
- Miraclathurella gracilis (Gabb, 1866)

Synonyms
- † Clathurella gracilis (Gabb, 1866); † Defrancia gracilis Gabb, 1866

= Miraclathurella gracilis =

Extinct species of gastropod

Miraclathurella gracilis is an extinct species of sea snail, a marine gastropod mollusk in the family Pseudomelatomidae, the turrids and allies.

== Description ==
The length of the shell attains 28.5 mm, its diameter 7.5 mm.

On the penult whorl there are sixteen axial ribs, crossed by five or six narrow spiral cords. On the body whorl there are about eighteen narrow, spiral cords, which are slightly enlarged where they cross the ribs and widely spaced in the peripheral region and above. Between them are many minute spirals and rather sharp axial striae.

== Distribution ==
Fossils of this marine species were found in Tertiary strata of Santo Domingo.
