= Darrylia clendenini =

Scientific classification
- Kingdom: Animalia
- Phylum: Mollusca
- Class: Gastropoda
- Subclass: Caenogastropoda
- Order: Neogastropoda
- Superfamily: Conoidea
- Family: Horaiclavidae
- Genus: Darrylia
- Species: D. clendenini

Binomial name
- Darrylia clendenini (García, 2008)

Synonyms
- Miraclathurella clendenini García, 2008 (original combination)

Species of gastropod

Darrylia clendenini is a species of sea snail, a marine gastropod mollusk in the family Horaiclavidae.
