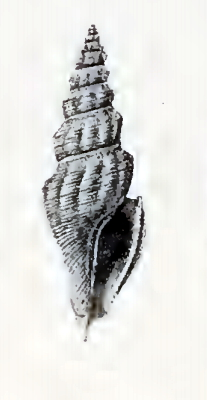
- Original image of a shell of Brachytoma rioensis

Scientific classification
- Kingdom: Animalia
- Phylum: Mollusca
- Class: Gastropoda
- Subclass: Caenogastropoda
- Order: Neogastropoda
- Superfamily: Conoidea
- Family: Pseudomelatomidae
- Genus: Brachytoma
- Species: B. rioensis

Binomial name
- Brachytoma rioensis (E.A. Smith, 1915)

Synonyms
- Drillia rioensis E.A. Smith, 1915; Lioglyphostoma rioensis (E.A. Smith, 1915)

= Brachytoma rioensis =

Species of gastropod

Brachytoma rioensis is a species of sea snail, a marine gastropod mollusk in the family Pseudomelatomidae.

== Description ==
The length of the shell varies between 15 mm and 25 mm.

(Original description) The fusiform shell is pale brown with whitish ribs. It contains 9 whorls. The two whorls in the protoconch are smooth, convex, and form a maminillar apex. The rest are concave above the convex, oblique ribs (ten on the penultimate whorl) with transverse tubercles on the middle caused by spiral lirae passing over them. The tubercles are more pronounced upon some of the upper volutions than upon the last two or three. In the upper concavity the threads are finer than those below. The body whorl is attenuated in front and finely lirate throughout. The aperture is white within. The outer lip shows a strong external varix a little way from the thin brown finely denticulate edge. The posterior sinus is moderately deep and rounded :The columella is smooth, with a thin callus united above to the end of the outer lip. The anterior canal is slightly recurved. Two of the spiral lirae around the middle of the whorls are more conspicuous than the rest, and much more distinctly nodulous. The fine growth lines are sinuose, and most evident at the upper part of the whorls.

== Distribution ==
This marine species occurs off Eastern & Southern Brazil at depths between 73 m and 125 m.
