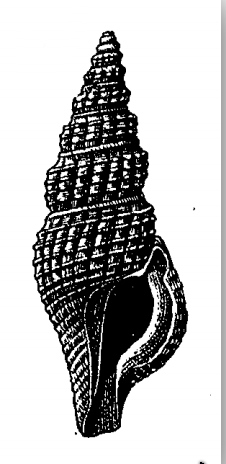
- Original image of a shell of Lioglyphostoma aguadillanum

Scientific classification
- Kingdom: Animalia
- Phylum: Mollusca
- Class: Gastropoda
- Subclass: Caenogastropoda
- Order: Neogastropoda
- Superfamily: Conoidea
- Family: Pseudomelatomidae
- Genus: Lioglyphostoma
- Species: L. aguadillanum

Binomial name
- Lioglyphostoma aguadillanum (W. H. Dall & C. T. Simpson, 1901)

Synonyms
- Euclathurella (Miraclathurella) aguadillana (Dall and Stimpson 1901); Glyphostoma aguadillana (Dall & Simpson, 1901); Mangilia aguadillana Dall & Simpson, 1901 (original combination); Miraclathurella aguadillana (Dall & Simpson, 1901)

= Lioglyphostoma aguadillanum =

Species of gastropod

Lioglyphostoma aguadillanum is a species of sea snail, a marine gastropod mollusk in the family Pseudomelatomidae, the turrids and allies.

There is one subspecies: Lioglyphostoma aguadillanum minor (Dall & Simpson, 1901) (exactly similar in sculpture, but of a pale-straw color, and is 8.5 mm. long and 3 mm. in maximum diameter)

== Description ==
The length of the shell attains 14 mm, its diameter 4 mm.

(Original description) The small, slender shell is solid. It contains nine whorls of which the first three are nepionic, smooth and polished, the subsequent elegantly axially ribbed, with two to four primary spiral threads and a fine interstitial spiral striation, essentially as figured. The shell is white with a superficial brownish tinge on the larger whorls, apex and interior of the outer lip of a delicate lilac. The outer lip is strongly thickened. The inner lip and the aperture are smooth or destitute of the denticulations usually found in Mangilia.

== Distribution ==
This marine species occurs off Puerto Rico.
