= Crassispira bataviana =

Scientific classification
- Kingdom: Animalia
- Phylum: Mollusca
- Class: Gastropoda
- Subclass: Caenogastropoda
- Order: Neogastropoda
- Superfamily: Conoidea
- Family: Pseudomelatomidae
- Genus: Crassispira
- Species: C. bataviana

Binomial name
- Crassispira bataviana (K. Martin 1895)

Synonyms
- † Drillia (Crassispira) bataviana Martin 1895; † Pleurotoma (Drillia) bataviana Martin, 1895

Extinct species of gastropod

Crassispira bataviana is an extinct species of sea snail, a marine gastropod mollusk in the family Pseudomelatomidae, the turrids and allies.

== Distribution ==
Fossils have been found in Miocene strata in Myanmar; age range: 23.03 to 20.43 Ma
