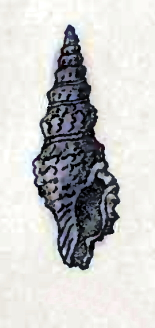
- Drawing of a shell of Miraclathurella bicanalifera

Scientific classification
- Kingdom: Animalia
- Phylum: Mollusca
- Class: Gastropoda
- Subclass: Caenogastropoda
- Order: Neogastropoda
- Superfamily: Conoidea
- Family: Pseudomelatomidae
- Genus: Miraclathurella
- Species: M. bicanalifera

Binomial name
- Miraclathurella bicanalifera (Sowerby I, 1834)

Synonyms
- Crassispira gracillima Carpenter, P.P., 1856; Crassispira variculosa Sowerby I, 1834; Lioglyphostoma acapulcanum Pilsbry, H.A. & H.N. Lowe, 1932; Mangilia variculosa Sowerby I, 1834; Miraclathurella acapulcanum Pilsbry & Lowe, 1932; Miraclathurella gracillima Carpenter, 1856; Miraclathurella nitida Sowerby I, 1834; Miraclathurella variculosa Sowerby I, 1834; Pleurotoma bicanalifera Sowerby I, 1834; Pleurotoma nitida Sowerby I, 1834

= Miraclathurella bicanalifera =

Species of gastropod

Miraclathurella bicanalifera is a species of sea snail, a marine gastropod mollusk in the family Pseudomelatomidae, the turrids and allies.

== Description ==
The length of the shell varies between 15 mm and 18 mm.

The whorls are narrowly shouldered. The longitudinal ribs are granose, crossed by raised striae. The color of the shell is dark chocolate-brown.

== Distribution ==
This marine species occurs in the Pacific Ocean off Panama; also off Costa Rica and Mexico.
