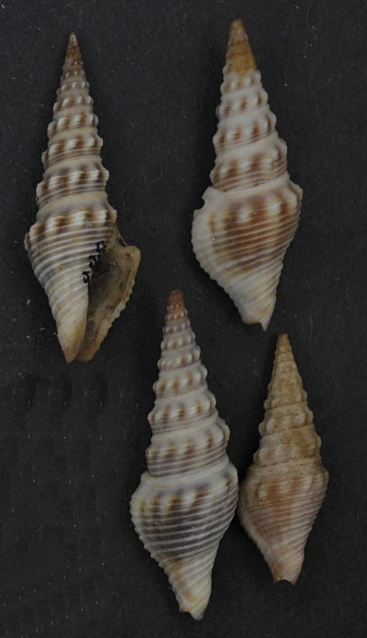
- Shells of Ptychobela suturalis (specimens at Naturalis Biodiversity Center)

Scientific classification
- Kingdom: Animalia
- Phylum: Mollusca
- Class: Gastropoda
- Subclass: Caenogastropoda
- Order: Neogastropoda
- Superfamily: Conoidea
- Family: Pseudomelatomidae
- Genus: Ptychobela
- Species: P. suturalis

Binomial name
- Ptychobela suturalis (Gray, 1838)

Synonyms
- Drillia suturalis Gray, 1838; Pleurotoma crenularis Kiener, 1840; Pleurotoma major Reeve, 1843

= Ptychobela suturalis =

Species of gastropod

Ptychobela suturalis is a species of sea snail, a marine gastropod mollusk in the family Pseudomelatomidae, the turrids and allies.

== Description ==
The length of the shell attains 40 mm, its diameter is 12.8 mm.

== Distribution ==
This marine species was found off Hainan Island, China.
