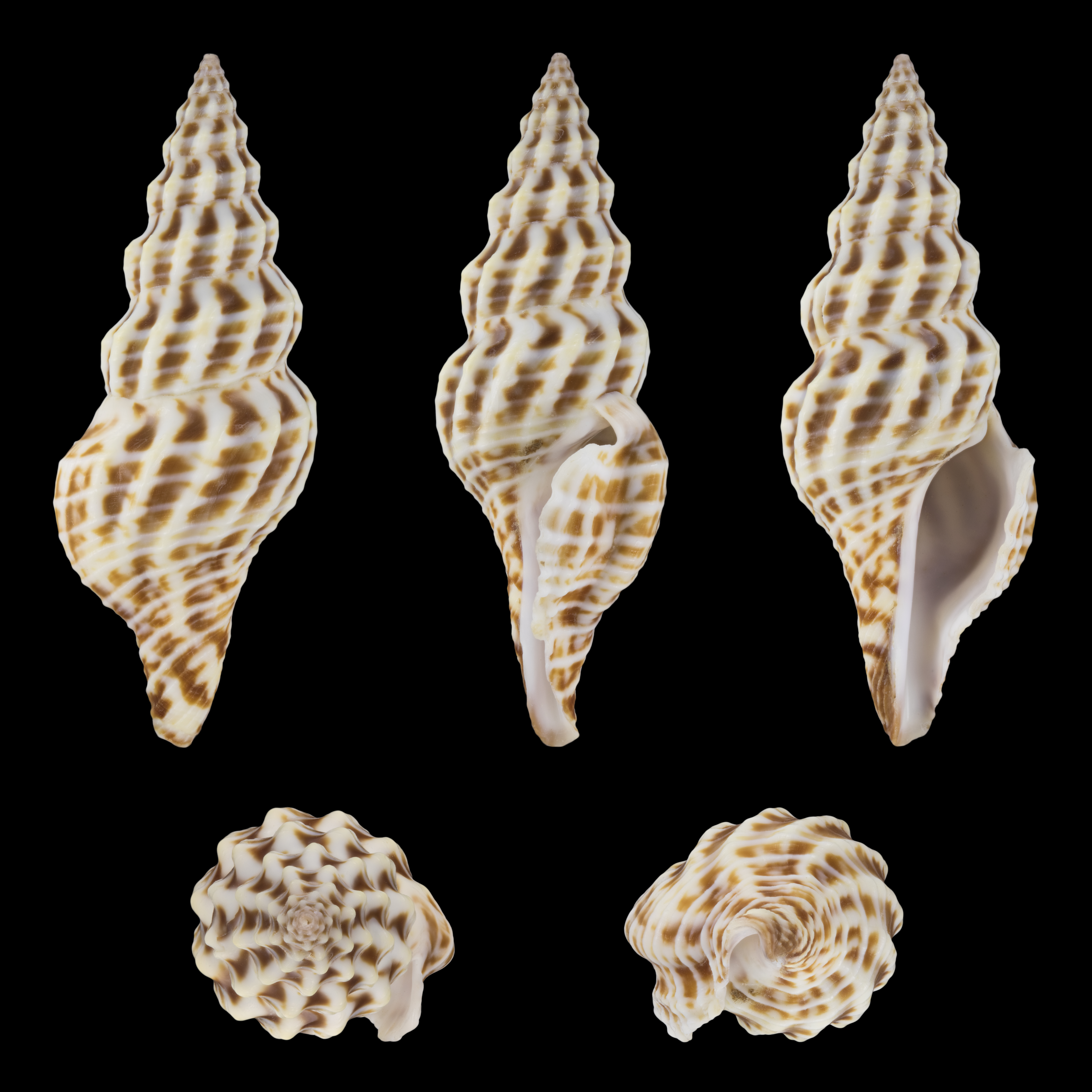
- Apertural view of a shell of Cheungbeia kawamurai

Scientific classification
- Kingdom: Animalia
- Phylum: Mollusca
- Class: Gastropoda
- Subclass: Caenogastropoda
- Order: Neogastropoda
- Superfamily: Conoidea
- Family: Pseudomelatomidae
- Genus: Cheungbeia
- Species: C. kawamurai

Binomial name
- Cheungbeia kawamurai (Habe & Kosuge, 1966)

Synonyms
- Brachytoma kawamurai Habe & Kosuge, 1966 (original combination); Inquisitor kawamurai Chang and Wu 2000; Ptychobela kawamurai Springsteen and Leobrera 1986

= Cheungbeia kawamurai =

Species of gastropod

Cheungbeia kawamurai is a species of sea snail, a marine gastropod mollusk in the family Pseudomelatomidae, the turrids and allies

== Description ==
The length of the shell attains 37 – 41 mm, its diameter 13.7 mm. Sculpture consists of strong spiral cords with fine spiral striae in between, crossed by about 11 thick axial ribs on the body whorl. The colour of the shell is brown but the spiral cords and axial ribs are white.

== Distribution ==
This species occurs off Taiwan and off the Philippines and is considered rare.
