= Crassispira takeokensis =

Scientific classification
- Kingdom: Animalia
- Phylum: Mollusca
- Class: Gastropoda
- Subclass: Caenogastropoda
- Order: Neogastropoda
- Superfamily: Conoidea
- Family: Pseudomelatomidae
- Genus: Crassispira
- Species: C. takeokensis

Binomial name
- Crassispira takeokensis (Y. Otuka, 1949)

Synonyms
- Brachytoma takeokensis Y. Otuka, 1949; Clathrodrillia takeokensis (Y. Otuka, 1949); Ptychobela takeokaensis Otuka, Y., 1949

Species of gastropod

Crassispira takeokensis is a species of sea snail, a marine gastropod mollusk in the family Pseudomelatomidae, the turrids and allies.

== Description ==
Crassispira takeokensis has a spiral shell with a length of 21.4 mm. found in sandy mud bottoms at depths 100-600m deep.

== Distribution ==
This marine species occurs off Japan found at depths between 740 m and 1030 m.
