= China Seas =

Series of marginal seas in the western Pacific Ocean

The China Seas consist of a series of marginal seas in the Western Pacific Ocean, around China. They are the major components signifying the transition from the continent of Asia to the Pacific Ocean. They have been described in terms of their collective vastness and complexity:

The four seas of China, the Bohai Sea, the Huanghai Sea, the East China Sea, and the South China Sea, occupy a total area of about 4.7 million sq. km, half of the area of Mainland China. These seas are located in the southeastern margin of the Eurasian continent and subject to the interactions between the Eurasian, Pacific, and Indian-Australian plates. The seas have complicated geology and rich natural resources.

Seas included in the China Seas are:

- The East China Sea
- The South China Sea
- The Yellow Sea (including Bohai Sea and Korea Bay)

== See also ==
- East Sea (Chinese literature)
- Four Seas
