= Waitaki Valley wine region =

Wine region of New Zealand

Waitaki Valley
- Wine region
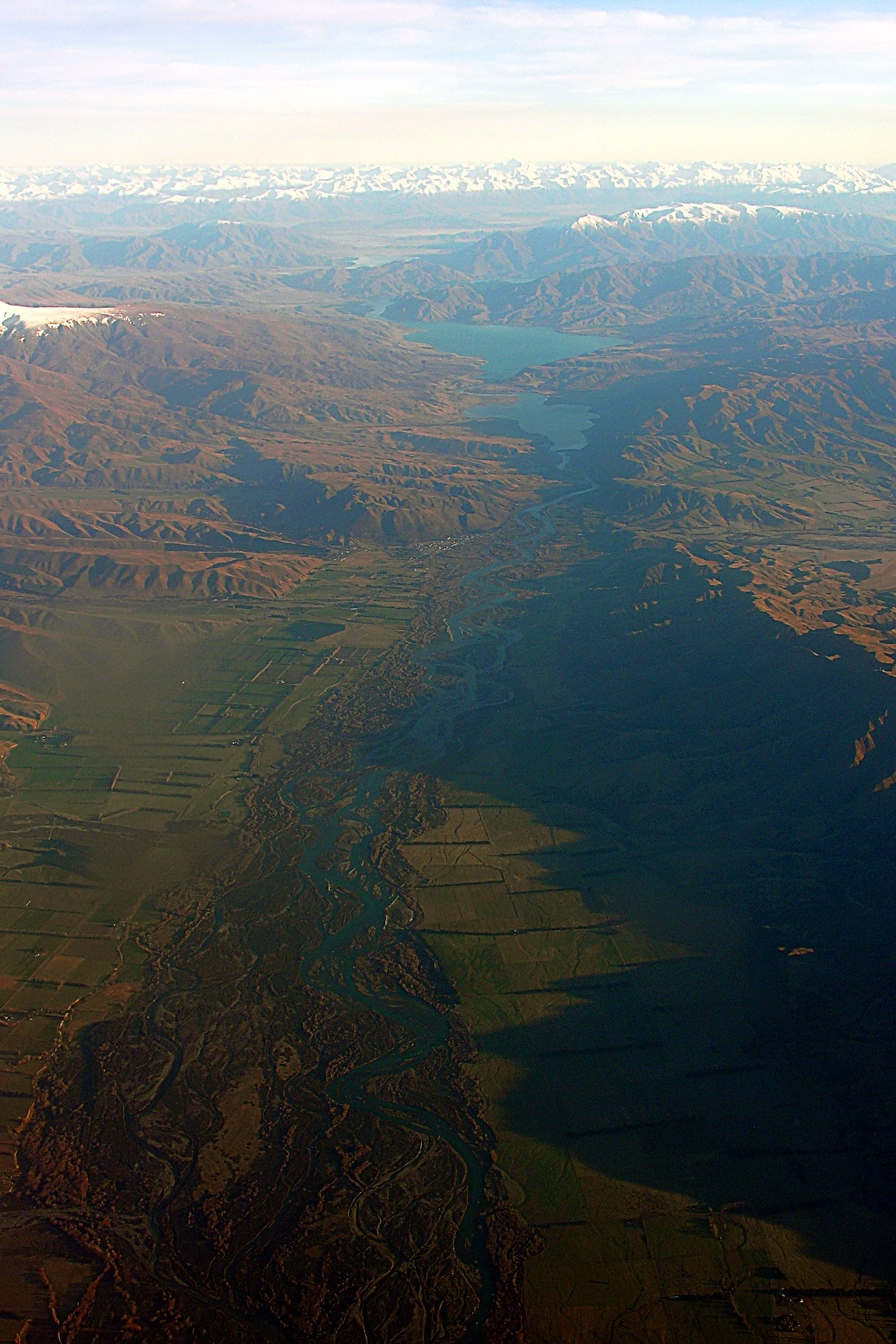
- Waitaki River and Benmore Dam, 2005
- Official name: Waitaki Valley North Otago / Waitaki Valley
- Type: Geographical indication
- Year established: Commercial planting from 2001; GI registered 2018
- Country: New Zealand
- Climate region: Cool, with maritime influence
- Soil conditions: Limestone-derived soils and alluvial gravels
- Size of planted vineyards: 49 ha (120 acres) (2025)
- No. of vineyards: 13 (2025)
- Grapes produced: 283 t (312 tons) (2025)
- Varietals produced: Pinot Noir; Pinot Gris; Chardonnay; Riesling
- No. of wineries: 5 (2025)
- Comments: Planted area and vineyard count: 2026 Vineyard Report; grape harvest and winery count: 2025 Annual Report.

Waitaki Valley North Otago, also registered as Waitaki Valley, is a small New Zealand wine region and geographical indication in North Otago, on the eastern side of New Zealand's South Island. The geographical indication was registered on 3 December 2018. Modern commercial planting began in 2001, making it one of the country's more recently developed wine regions. Its principal varieties are Pinot Noir, Pinot Gris, Chardonnay and Riesling.

The region is distinguished by limestone slopes and river gravels containing greywacke and schist, together with a cool climate influenced by the Pacific Ocean. Warm summers and prolonged autumn ripening can support a long growing season, although frost and low yields make viticulture demanding. Its wines have developed a reputation for restrained structure, freshness and aromatic intensity, with a character distinct from neighbouring Central Otago.

Commercial development has remained small in scale. Early producers included Clos Ostler, Forrest and Valli, and the region has received recognition in national and international wine competitions. In 2025, Clos Ostler's Caroline's Pinot Noir won the New Zealand Red Trophy at the International Wine Challenge; its EOS Pinot Noir subsequently received the region's first Platinum medal at the Decanter World Wine Awards in 2026.

== Geography ==
The winegrowing area follows the southern side of the Waitaki River, which forms the provincial boundary between Otago and Canterbury. Vineyards extend along a corridor described by the New Zealand Wine Directory as approximately 75 kilometres (47 mi) long, from the limestone escarpments near Duntroon towards Omarama, taking in the valley around Kurow.

The valley links the eastern coast with the inland country below the Southern Alps. Its vineyard sites include north-facing slopes and former river terraces. Erosion and deposition by rivers and glaciers have produced a varied landscape of exposed limestone and stony alluvium. The registered wine region is separate from both the Canterbury and Central Otago geographical indications.

== History ==
=== Early vineyards ===
Experimental planting preceded the development of commercial viticulture. The small vineyard that became Clay Cliffs Estate was planted near Omarama in the mid-1980s and produced 140 bottles of Pinot Gris in 1994.

Interest in larger-scale vineyard development increased in the late 1990s. Entrepreneur Howard Paterson and winemaker Jeff Sinnott separately identified the valley's north-facing, limestone-rich hillsides as potential sites for cool-climate Pinot Noir. Plantings associated with Paterson's development venture began in 2001.

Jim Jerram and Sinnott began investigating sites in 1998. Their selection of a limestone slope near Duntroon led to the establishment of Clos Ostler, where Pinot Noir was first planted in 2002 and further Pinot Noir and Pinot Gris followed over the next two years. The site's assessment included climatic modelling from three weather stations. Its early development subsequently required frost protection and sustained investment despite low yields.

The Waitaki Valley Winegrowers Association was formed in 2005. Early commercial releases helped establish the use of the Waitaki Valley name on wine labels.

=== Consolidation and regional recognition ===
The initial expansion was followed by financial and climatic difficulties. A 2013 account in New Zealand Winegrower described the combined effects of low yields, production costs, remoteness and the global financial crisis. Pasquale announced its withdrawal, while Craggy Range had already left as part of a decision to concentrate production on its own vineyards elsewhere. Other growers, including Ostler, continued developing their Waitaki vineyards.

Published accounts reflect the region's subsequent contraction. Weinman on Wine reported approximately 100 hectares (250 acres) under vine in 2017, while New Zealand Winegrower reported 59 hectares (150 acres) of planted vineyard in 2023. The 2026 New Zealand Winegrowers vineyard report recorded 49 hectares (120 acres) planted and 45 hectares (110 acres) producing in 2025. Its projections for 2026 were 46 hectares (110 acres) planted and 43 hectares (110 acres) producing.

The geographical indication Waitaki Valley North Otago / Waitaki Valley was registered on 3 December 2018. Ostler winemaker Jeff Sinnott, a founding member of the growers' association, prepared the application. Contemporary reporting emphasised the valley's limestone soils, maritime climate and small, predominantly family-operated vineyards as features of its regional identity.

== Soil and climate ==
=== Geology and soils ===
Limestone was an important factor in the selection of the valley's earliest commercial vineyard sites. New Zealand Winegrowers describes the north-facing limestone landforms as the result of uplift of an ancient seabed dating from approximately 38 million years ago. These marine deposits form part of the wider North Otago landscape associated with Oamaru stone and the nearby Elephant Rocks.

Vineyard soils vary between weathered limestone slopes and free-draining river gravels containing greywacke, schist and limestone. The stony surfaces absorb heat and reflect sunlight, which can assist ripening in a cool environment. The region's combination of marine limestone and glacial deposits distinguishes its soils from those of inland Central Otago.

The wider North Otago limestone country also contains Rendzic Melanic soils, recorded by the Otago Regional Council in small areas south and west of Oamaru. These soils have limestone or calcareous rock close to the surface and can have limited rooting depth and summer water availability. In the New Zealand Soil Classification, Rendzic Melanic soils form part of the Melanic order, characterised by dark, well-structured topsoils and high base saturation. The Melanic order as a whole covers about one per cent of New Zealand's land area.

Comparisons with Burgundy have accompanied the region's development. Sinnott's initial assessment of the north-facing limestone slope that became Clos Ostler drew a parallel with Burgundian vineyard sites. The comparison concerns site characteristics and cool-climate grape growing; Waitaki's wines have also been described as possessing their own regional character.

=== Climate and growing season ===
The Southern Alps provide a rain shadow, while the Pacific Ocean moderates temperatures. Summers can be warm and dry, and autumn conditions can extend the period available for ripening. Frost remains a risk at both ends of the growing season. The valley's maritime influence distinguishes it from Central Otago's more continental climate.

Climate records from Hakataramea Valley cited in the 2017 geographical-indication application gave annual heat accumulation of about 850 growing degree-days above a 10 °C (50 °F) base and annual rainfall of 380 millimetres (15 in). These figures describe the reference station used in the application.

Late harvesting is a feature of some vintages. A 2017 account of Clos Ostler recorded Pinot Noir harvests in May and Pinot Gris harvested on 30 May, illustrating the extended ripening possible in the valley. The same account noted the risks posed by frost and late rain, and the resulting variability in yields.

== Viticulture and winemaking ==
Projected planted vineyard area by variety in Waitaki Valley, 2026 (approximately 46 hectares (110 acres)).
1. Pinot Noir (45.9%)
2. Pinot Gris (28.3%)
3. Chardonnay (17.0%)
4. Riesling (6.40%)
5. Other (2.40%)
New Zealand Winegrowers, Vineyard Report 2026, p. 18.

New Zealand Winegrowers recorded 13 vineyards in the region in 2025; ten were no larger than five hectares. The dominant variety was Pinot Noir, followed by Pinot Gris, Chardonnay and Riesling, with smaller plantings including Gewürztraminer and Chenin Blanc. The 2025 vintage survey recorded 283 tonnes (312 tons) of grapes harvested in Waitaki Valley.

Careful site selection and low cropping levels are important to ripening in this cool climate. The 2017 geographical-indication application described hand harvesting, small-batch production and the transport of much of the fruit to wineries outside the region for vinification. Producers also face practical challenges associated with a small and relatively isolated industry, including access to contract labour and machinery servicing.

Small, predominantly family-operated vineyards are a feature of the region. Clos Ostler is one example of small-scale production, with some individual wines limited to a few hundred cases.

Pinot Noir is the region's principal red wine. Wine writer Bob Campbell, writing in Decanter, distinguished Waitaki's restrained, delicate Pinot Noir from the style of Central Otago. A 2013 regional assessment also identified savoury Pinot Noir, elegant Riesling and Pinot Gris, and an emerging reputation for Chardonnay.

New Zealand Winegrowers lists Clos Ostler, Valli, Forrest Wines, Q Wine and River-T Estate Wines among producers associated with Waitaki Valley.

== Recognition ==
Waitaki wines have received attention in both specialist reviews and competitions. In its 2025 national Pinot Noir tasting, Dish identified Waitaki alongside Central Otago and Marlborough as regions prominent among the results. Caroline's Pinot Noir 2020 and 2021 from Clos Ostler both received gold medals.

At the 2025 International Wine Challenge, Clos Ostler's Caroline's Pinot Noir 2021 received the New Zealand Red Trophy, New Zealand Pinot Noir Trophy and North Otago Pinot Noir Trophy.

At the 2026 Decanter World Wine Awards, Clos Ostler's EOS Pinot Noir 2022 received 97 points and a Platinum medal, the first Platinum awarded to a wine from Waitaki Valley. Decanter subsequently included it in a selection of 15 award-winning Pinot Noirs from the competition.

== See also ==
- Alps 2 Ocean Cycle Trail
- Central Otago wine region
- New Zealand wine

== Bibliography ==
- Cooper, Michael (2008). Wine Atlas of New Zealand (2nd ed.). Auckland: Hodder & Stoughton. ISBN 978-1-86971-091-0. OCLC 236507204. Wikidata Q131767903.
