= Inquisitor komiticus =

Scientific classification
- Kingdom: Animalia
- Phylum: Mollusca
- Class: Gastropoda
- Subclass: Caenogastropoda
- Order: Neogastropoda
- Superfamily: Conoidea
- Family: Pseudomelatomidae
- Genus: Inquisitor
- Species: †I. komiticus

Binomial name
- †Inquisitor komiticus Laws, 1939

Extinct species of gastropod

Inquisitor komiticus is an extinct species of sea snail, a marine gastropod mollusk in the family Pseudomelatomidae, the turrids and allies.

== Description ==
The length (estimated) attains 22 mm, its diameter 6 mm.

(Original description) The shell is fairly small and attenuated, bearing a very close resemblance to Inquisitor awamoaensis (Hutton, 1873). The protoconch is pointed and polygyrate, appearing nearly identical to that of I. awamoaensis. However, Inquisitor waihoraensis (Marwick, 1931) can be distinguished by its lower keel, which results in a wider shoulder; its axial elements are also sharper, and it possesses fewer, heavier spirals than Inquisitor komiticus (Laws, 1939)

Specific differences in ornamentation further distinguish these species. The swollen subsutural border of I. awamoaensis features two low, indistinct threads, whereas that of I. komiticus carries three which are distinctly incised. On the shoulder, the former species possesses two very distinct and widely separated spiral threadlets, while I. komiticus displays eight distinct, closely packed threads. Below the angulation of the whorl, I. komiticus exhibits seven to eight strong, thick spirals—frequently accompanied by interstitial threadlets—whereas I. awamoaensis has only five or six. These spirals in I. awamoaensis are thinner and more widely spaced, with an interstitial threadlet positioned between each pair.

== Distribution ==
This extinct marine species was found in Awamoan strata at Pukeuri, New Zealand.
