= Alps 2 Ocean Cycle Trail =

Cycle trail in New Zealand

Coordinates: 43.7192°S 170.0937°E

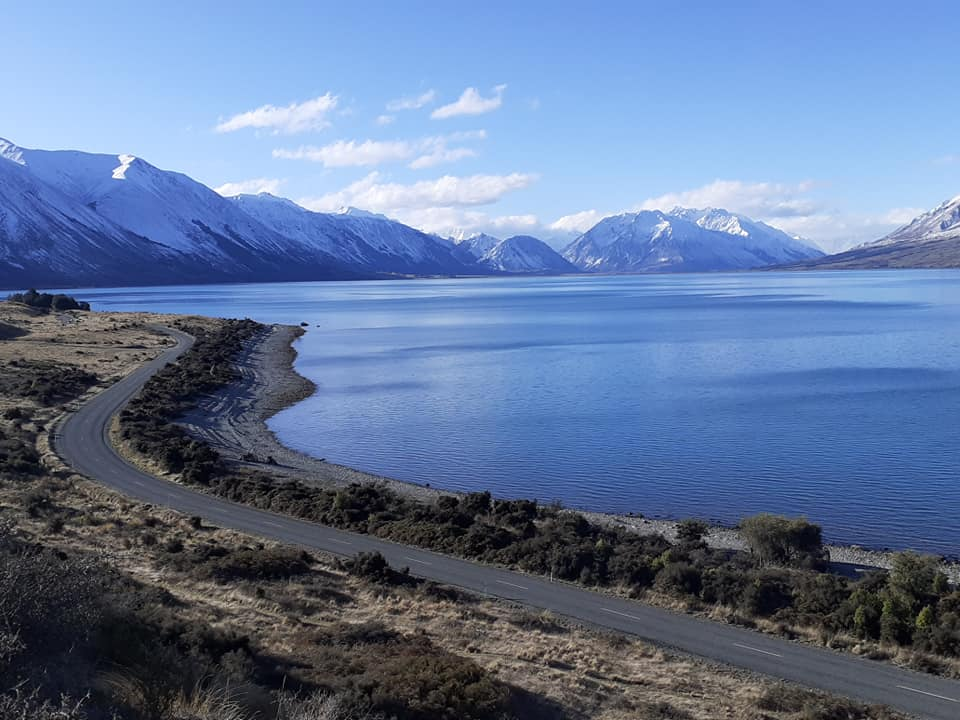
- Lake Ohau from Lake Ohau Village
- Length: 315 km (196 mi)
- Location: Mackenzie, Waitaki districts, New Zealand
- Trailheads: Aoraki / Mount Cook National Park, Oamaru
- Use: Cycling; Walking
- Season: Year round
- Sights: Alpine scenery, rural scenery, lakes and rivers
- Website: www.alps2ocean.com

Trail map
- Interactive map of the Alps 2 Ocean trail

The Alps 2 Ocean Cycle Trail is a cycle trail in the South Island of New Zealand. This trail is one of the projects of the New Zealand Cycle Trail project. The trail extends more than 300 km (190 mi) from Aoraki / Mount Cook to Oamaru on the Pacific Ocean. From west to east, it descends from an altitude of 780 metres (2,560 ft) down to sea level. The trail has both on and off-road sections.

Funding for the trail from the New Zealand Community Trust budget was approved in July 2010, after the trail had been shortlisted as one of 13 from 54 nationwide proposals.

== Sections ==
The trail is composed of eight sections:

=== Aoraki / Mount Cook to Braemar Station ===
The first section, which is 32 km (20 mi) long, starts out on a dedicated cycle trail, and continues on a gravel road. The first section is the most remote section of the trail and includes stream crossings without bridges.

=== Braemar Station to Twizel ===
Continuing on a gravel road over hilly terrain, this 43 km (27 mi) section takes in the southern shore of Lake Pukaki and the hydro-electric system of the area around Twizel once on sealed roads. Towards Twizel, the cycle trail leads across the Pukaki Flats, an area of tussock grasslands that are typical for the Mackenzie basin. Twizel is the largest town along the cycle path until the conclusion at Oamaru.

=== Twizel to Lake Ōhau ===
The third section is 38 km (24 mi) long and is the only one with a slight gain in elevation. It partly follows canals that are part of the hydro-electric system connecting the glacial lakes. A cycle trail goes around the southern shore of Lake Ōhau, finishing on a sealed road to Lake Ohau Alpine Village and the Lake Ōhau Lodge.

=== Lake Ōhau to Omarama ===
The next section leads through an old beech forest and includes the biggest elevation changes. It climbs about 400 metres (1,300 ft) along the Ōhau Range to the highest point of the trail at over 900 metres (3,000 ft) above sea level, before descending to about 100 metres (330 ft) lower after a total length of 40 km (25 mi).

=== Omarama to Otematata ===
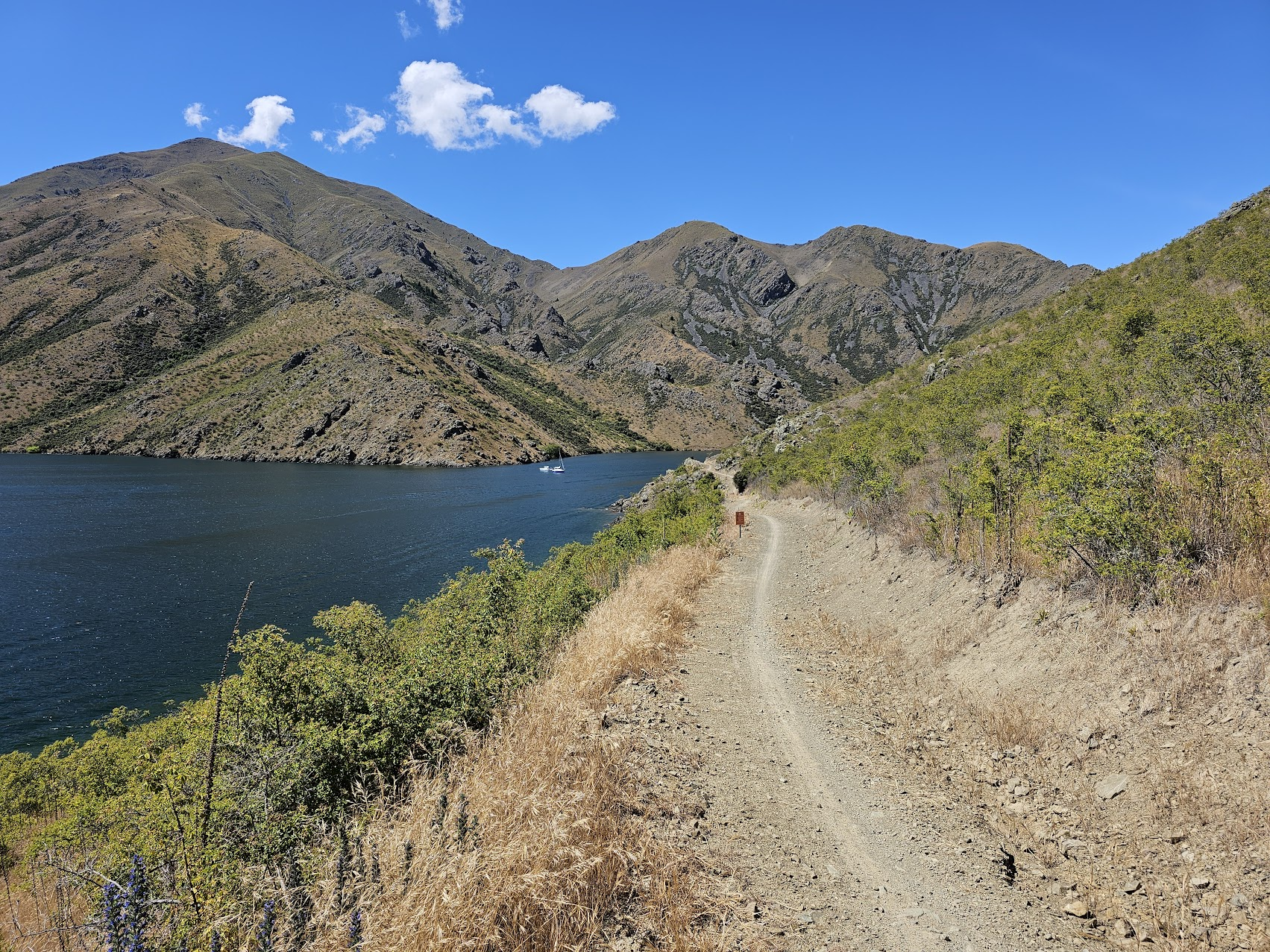
Downhill section of Alps 2 Ocean, just past Sailors Cutting, on the edge of Lake Benmore

The first half of this 24 km (15 mi) section over the Omarama Saddle is on a dedicated cycle trail next to SH83, from Sailors Cutting the trail follows the edge of Lake Benmore to Benmore Dam. From here it is a 6 km (3.7 mi) detour off the main route to Otematata.

=== Otematata to Kurow ===
Continuing into the Waitaki Valley is the sixth section. It is 44 km (27 mi) long and follows sealed public roads and takes in Benmore Dam, the largest dam within the Waitaki hydro-electric power scheme, as well as Aviemore Dam and Waitaki Dam. An off-road 16 km (9.9 mi) cycling section was opened on 17 December 2020, from Sailors Cutting to the top of the Benmore Dam in the Waitaki Lakes region. $1.2 million was spent creating the section.

=== Kurow to Duntroon ===
From Kurow, the cycle trail continues 23 km (14 mi) off-road to Duntroon. The area contains limestone formations, Maori rock drawings, dinosaur fossils, and several vineyards that make up part of the Waitaki Valley wine region.

=== Duntroon to Oamaru ===
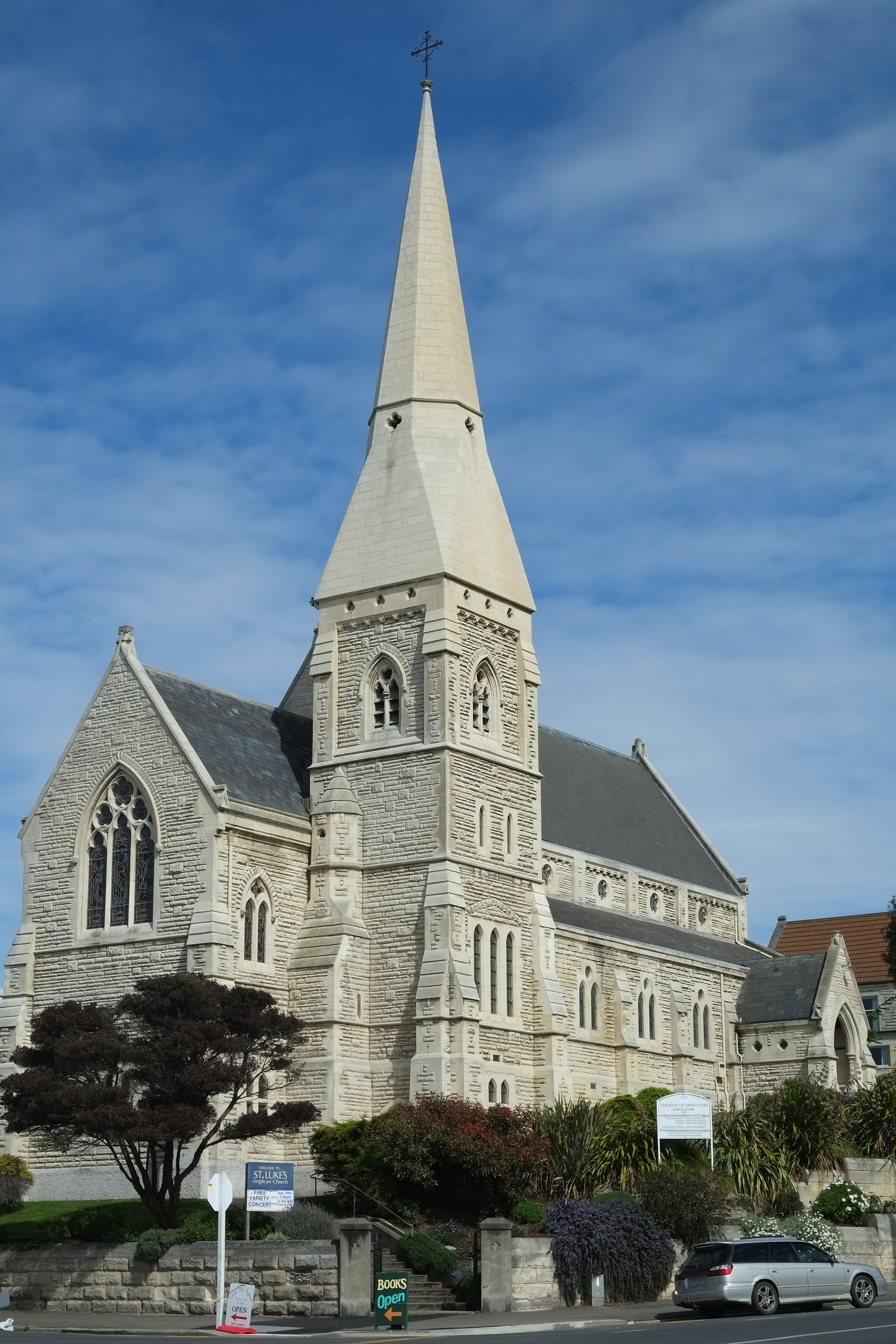
Historic town of Oamaru along the trail.

The last section partly follows the Vanished World trail and past the Elephant Rocks on a mix of sealed public back roads and dedicated cycle trails. From Weston, the cycle trail follows an old railway line and enters Oamaru via the Oamaru Gardens. It finishes after 55 km (34 mi) at Friendly Bay, adjacent to Oamaru's Victorian Historic Precinct.

== Sites ==
Sites on the trail include: • Aoraki/Mt Cook • Snow-capped Mountains • Golden Tussock Landscapes • Glacier Lake Tours • High Country Stations • Hydro Canals • Native Forests • Elephant Rocks • Limestone and Clay Cliffs • Maori Rock Art • Vanished World Fossil Sites • Boutique Shops • Museums • Lakes: Ōhau, Pukaki, Benmore, Aviemore • Historic Limestone Tunnels • Hydro Dams: Benmore, Aviemore, Waitaki • Waitaki Valley wine region • Oamaru's Victorian Precinct • Galleries & Gifts • Steampunk HQ, Oamaru • Blue Penguin Colony • Pacific Ocean
