= Takiroa Rock Art Shelter =

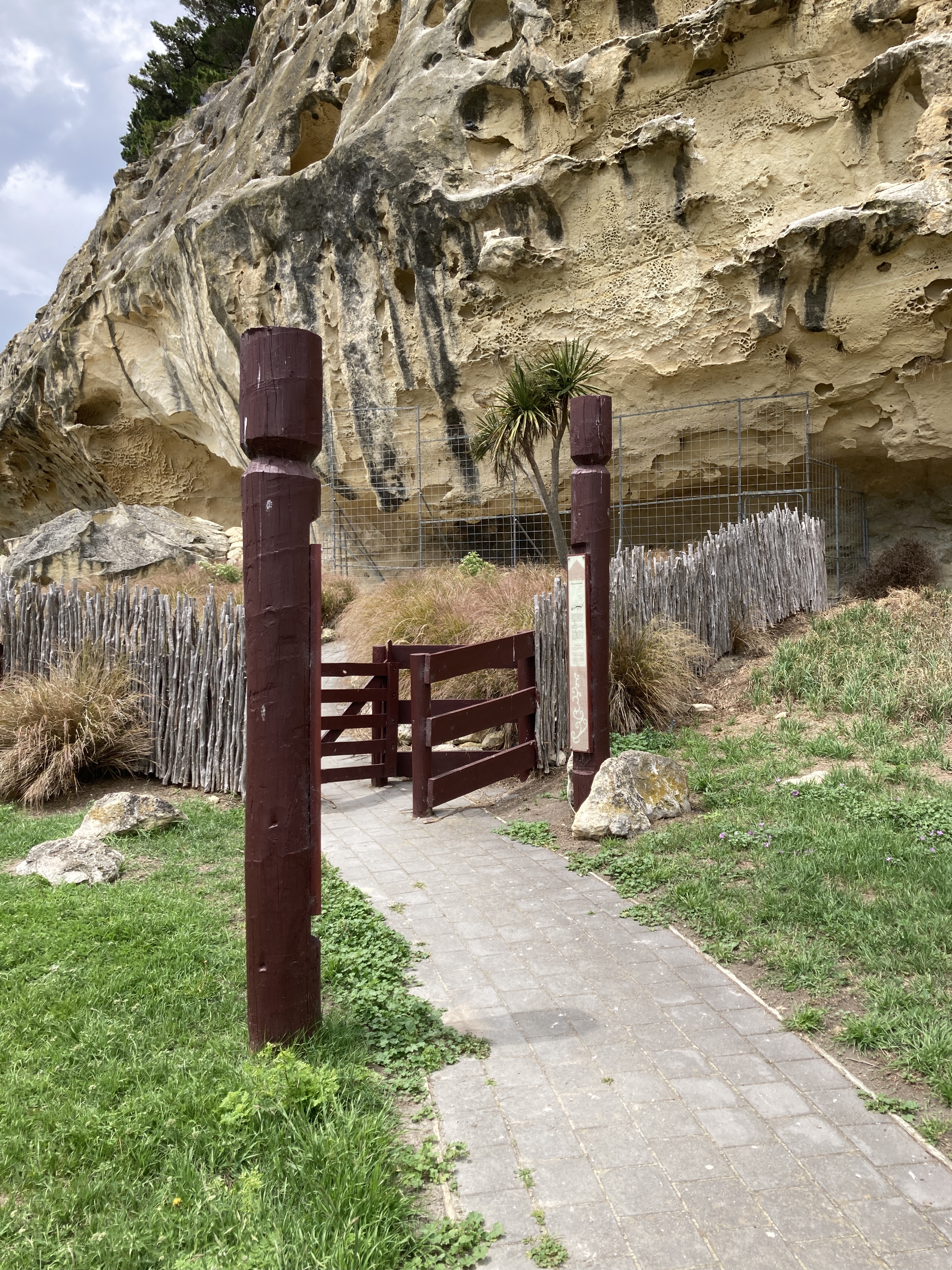

- Location within New Zealand
- 44°50′34.41″S 170°38′41.91″E
- Type: Rock art
- Location: Canterbury, New Zealand

Heritage New Zealand – Category 2
- Designated: 16 April 1985
- Reference no.: 5653

The Takiroa Rock Art Shelter is an archaeological site located along State Highway 83 near Duntroon, New Zealand. The site features a limestone rock shelter containing several pieces of Māori rock art, dating between 1400 and 1900 AD. The shelter is open to public viewing, with fences constructed to protect the artwork from damage.

== Rock art ==
The Takiroa Historic Area features several Māori drawings made from ochre, bird fat, and charcoal. The subject matter present in the shelter is variable. Some drawings have been interpreted as people and animals, such as birds. Depictions of European settlers are also apparent, which feature the likes of horses and ships.

Examples of Māori rock art at Takiroa

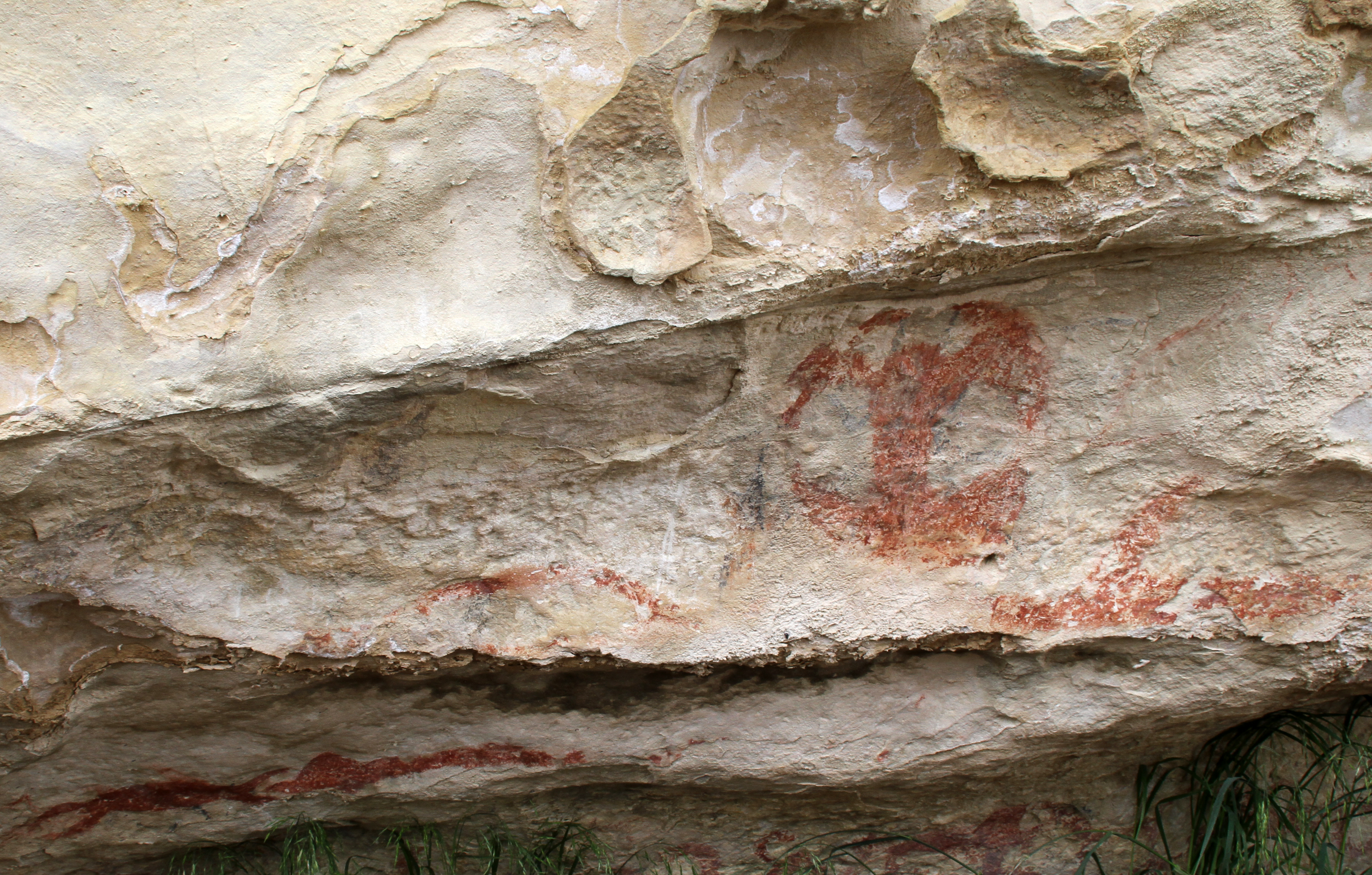

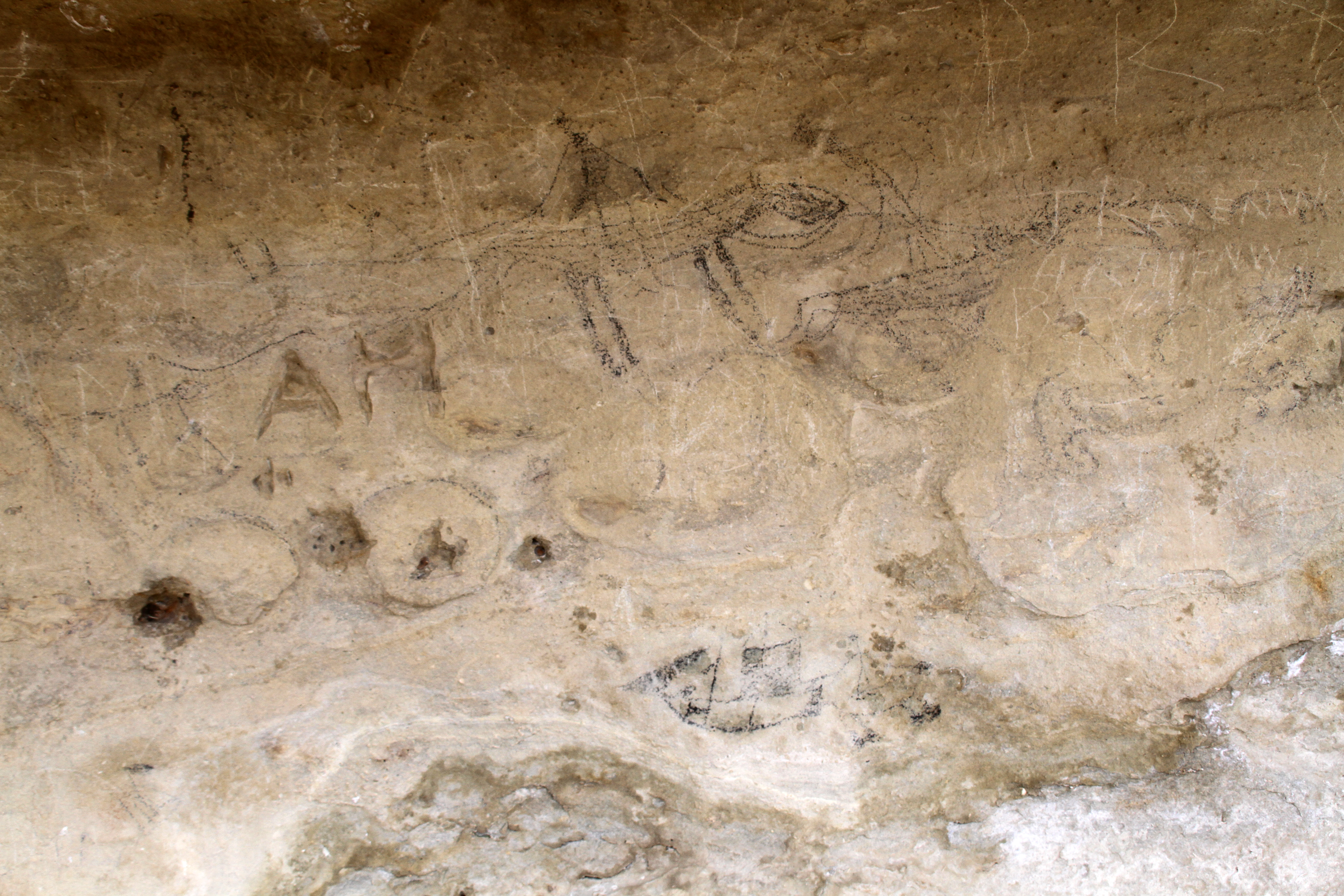

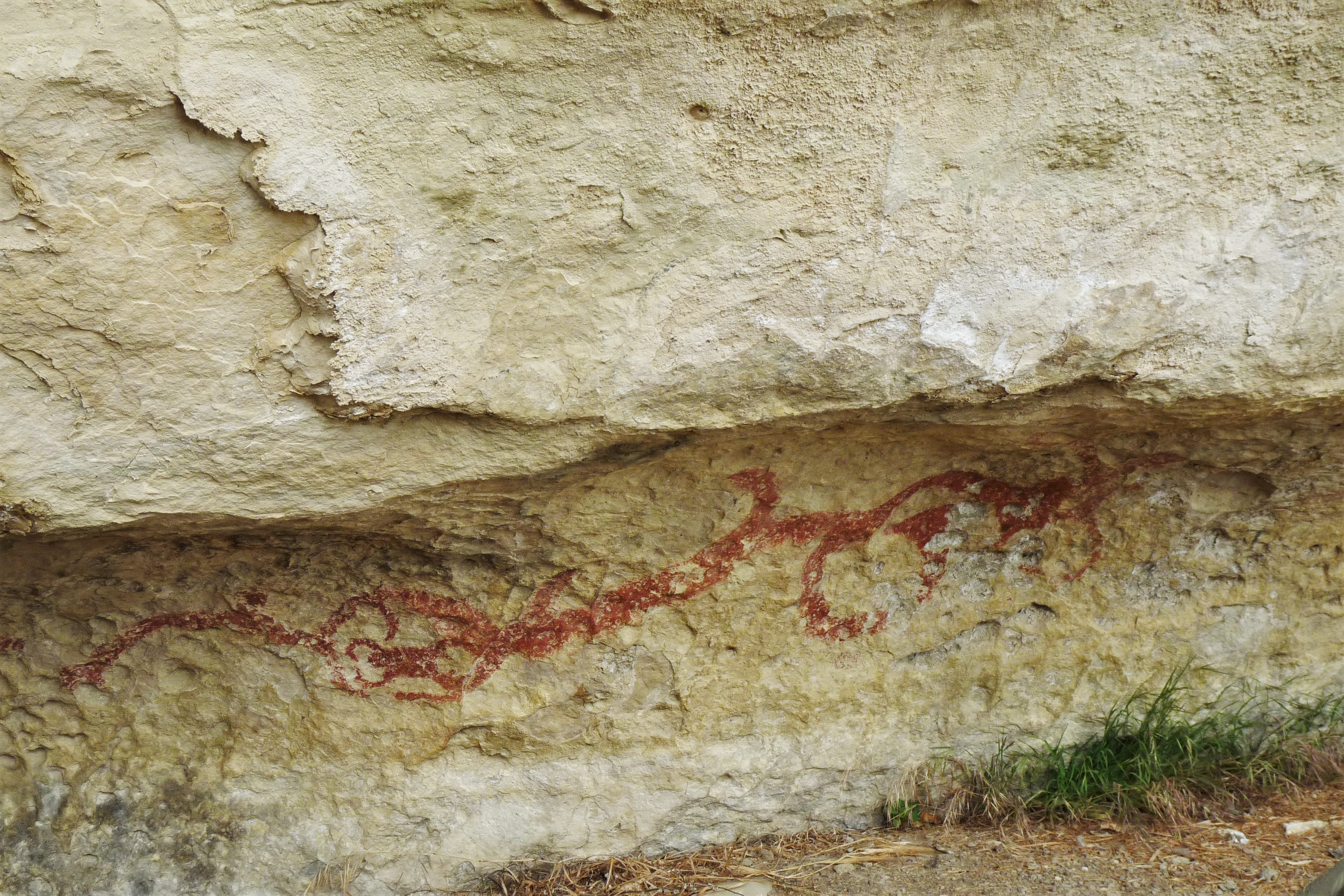

== History ==
Several pieces of artwork were removed from the rockface around 1913 for display in museum collections. Fences were erected in 1930 and 1964 in order to prevent damage to the artwork by livestock and visitors, however these measures were generally ineffective. Heritage New Zealand (then known as the New Zealand Historic Places Trust), which managed the shelter, listed it as a Category II Historic Place in 1985. Under the Ngāi Tahu Claims Settlement Act 1998, the Crown vested administration of the shelter to Te Rūnanga o Ngāi Tahu.

In May 2010, a large portion of overhanging rock at the Takiroa Shelter fell, destroying the protective fences but leaving the rock art relatively unscathed. The shelter was subsequently closed to the public until March 2012, after repairs were completed.
