= Duntroon, New Zealand =

Duntroon
- Town
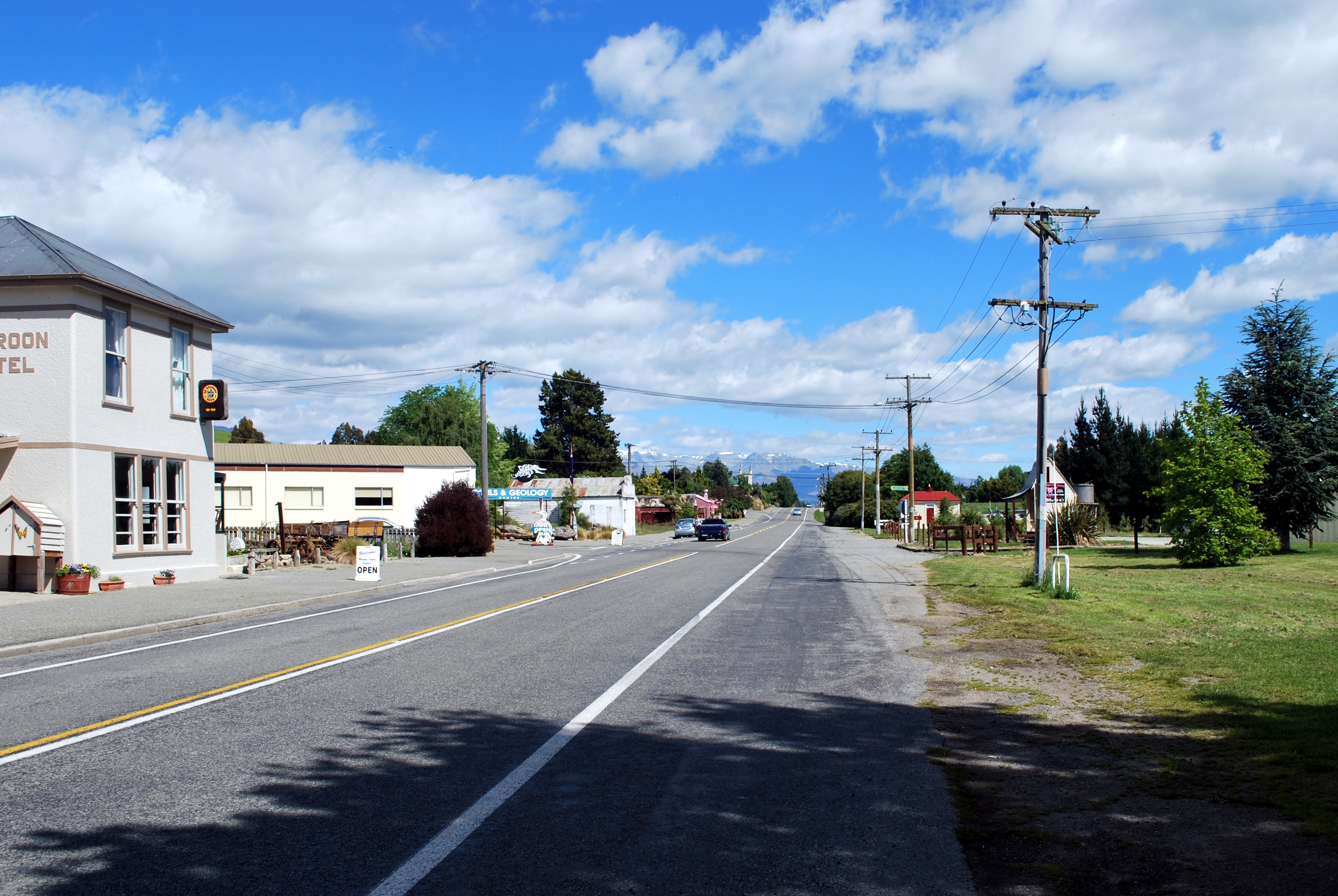
- Campbell St (State Highway 83), the main street
- Interactive map of Duntroon
- Coordinates: 44°51′17″S 170°41′2″E
- Country: New Zealand
- Region: Canterbury
- Territorial authority: Waitaki District
- Ward: Ahuriri Ward
- Community: Ahuriri Community
- Electorates: Waitaki; Te Tai Tonga (Māori)

Government
  - Territorial authority: Waitaki District Council
  - Regional council: Environment Canterbury
  - Mayor of Waitaki: Melanie Tavendale
  - Waitaki MP: Miles Anderson
  - Te Tai Tonga MP: Mananui Ramsden

Area
  - Total: 5.13 km^{2} (1.98 sq mi)

Population (June 2025)
  - Total: 100
  - Density: 19/km^{2} (50/sq mi)
- Time zone: UTC+12 (New Zealand Standard Time)
  - Summer (DST): UTC+13 (New Zealand Daylight Time)
- Postcode: 9445
- Local iwi: Ngāi Tahu

Duntroon (from Scottish Gaelic: Dùn Treòin) is a small farming-town in the Waitaki District of New Zealand's South Island. Although once a North Otago town, it is now within Canterbury. Just north of the town runs the Waitaki River, which formed the former border between the two regions, before the border moved south to put most of Waitaki District, including Duntroon, within Canterbury. To the east of the village runs the Maerewhenua River. Near the village are the Earthquakes, a limestone-cliff formation.

The town was named by Scottish settler and farmer Robert Campbell. Economic activity has been mainly agricultural for much of the town's history, focusing primarily on sheep farming and on the growing of crops such as wheat and barley.

Viticulture also forms part of the surrounding area's agriculture. Clos Ostler, in the Waitaki Valley wine region, occupies a north-facing limestone escarpment near Duntroon. The vineyard is planted predominantly to Pinot noir, with smaller plantings of Pinot gris and Chardonnay.

Duntroon is home to the Vanished World Heritage Centre, dedicated to showcasing the geology of the Waitaki region and preserving fossils of extinct species that have been found in the region. These include two species of the penguin genus Archaeospheniscus, Lowe's penguin and Lopdell's penguin, found in the Kokoamu Greensand formation. The town is also located near two sites of centuries-old Māori rock drawings, one of which being the Takiroa Rock Art Shelter.

5 kilometres (3 mi) south of Duntroon, in the Maerewhenua Valley, a group of large rock-formations called "Elephant Rocks" was used as a filming location for the first Chronicles of Narnia movie in 2005. The rock formations, located in a private field, are visible from the road.

== Transport ==
Duntroon was once the terminus of the branch line railway that ultimately became the Kurow Branch, and was one of the few towns to be served by a railway station for the entire life of the line (most others were closed earlier than the line itself). In 1875, the railway from the junction with the Main South Line at Pukeuri was opened to Duntroon, but due to bridging difficulties, the line terminated outside Duntroon on the east side of the Maerewhenua River. In 1878, construction began on another line from Duntroon to Kurow; on 2 July 1881, the Maerewhenua River was bridged and Duntroon was linked to the national railway network; on 7 November 1881, the line beyond Duntroon opened and the town lost its status as terminus. The railway served the town for over a century, closing in mid-1983, and the old railway station now serves as boutique accommodation for fly fishermen and cyclists on the A2O cycle trail. Near the station building, an old water tank for steam locomotives still stands in good condition.

Duntroon is on the route of the Alps to Ocean Cycle Trail, which was constructed from 2011 after approval in 2010.

== Demographics ==
Duntroon is described as a rural settlement by Statistics New Zealand, and covers 5.13 km^{2} (1.98 sq mi). It had an estimated population of 100 as of June 2025, with a population density of 19 people per km^{2}. It is part of the larger Danseys Pass statistical area.

Historical population
Year	Pop.	±% p.a.
1996	117	—
2001	120	+0.51%
2006	99	−3.77%
2013	75	−3.89%
2018	96	+5.06%
2023	93	−0.63%

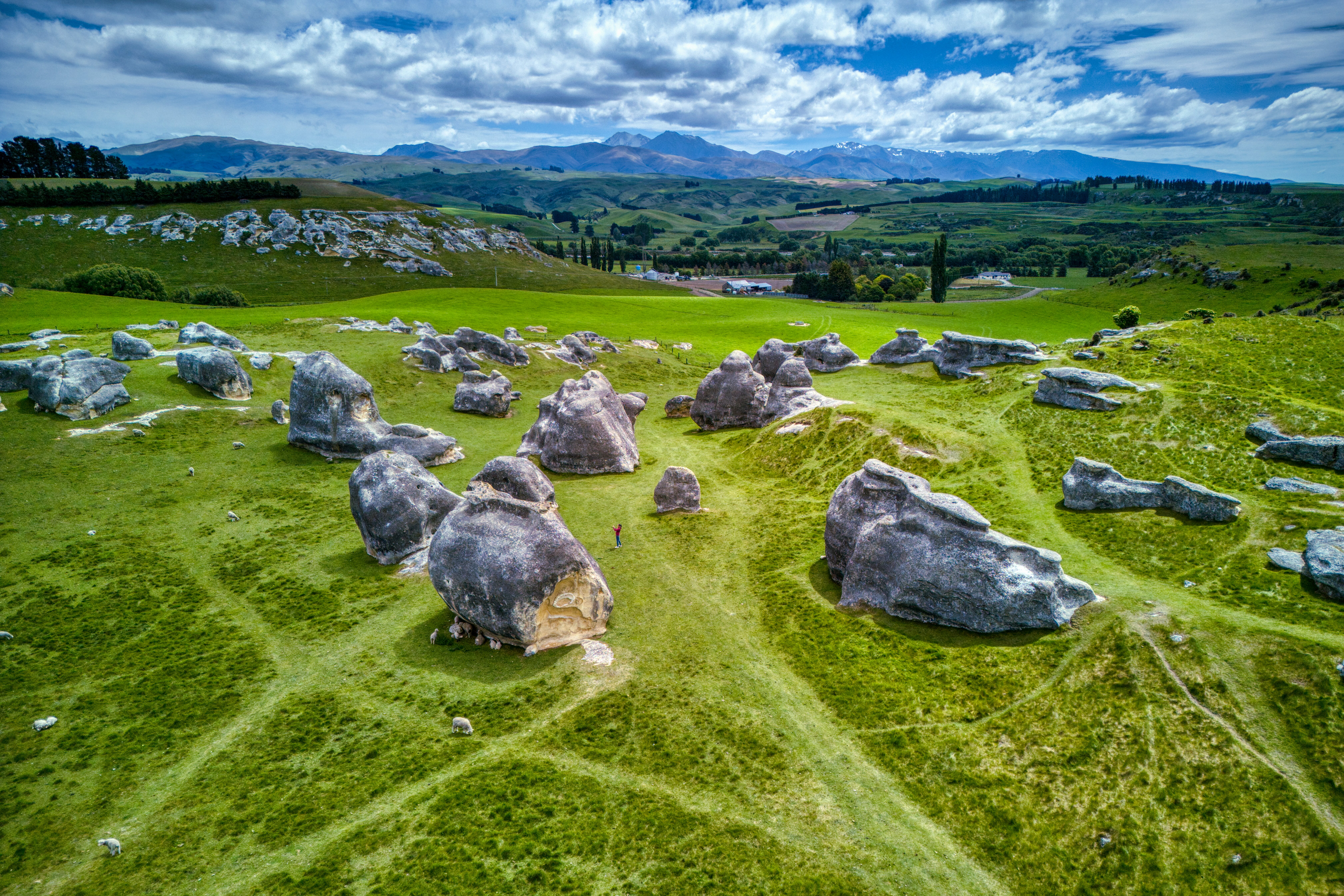
Elephant Rocks near Duntroon

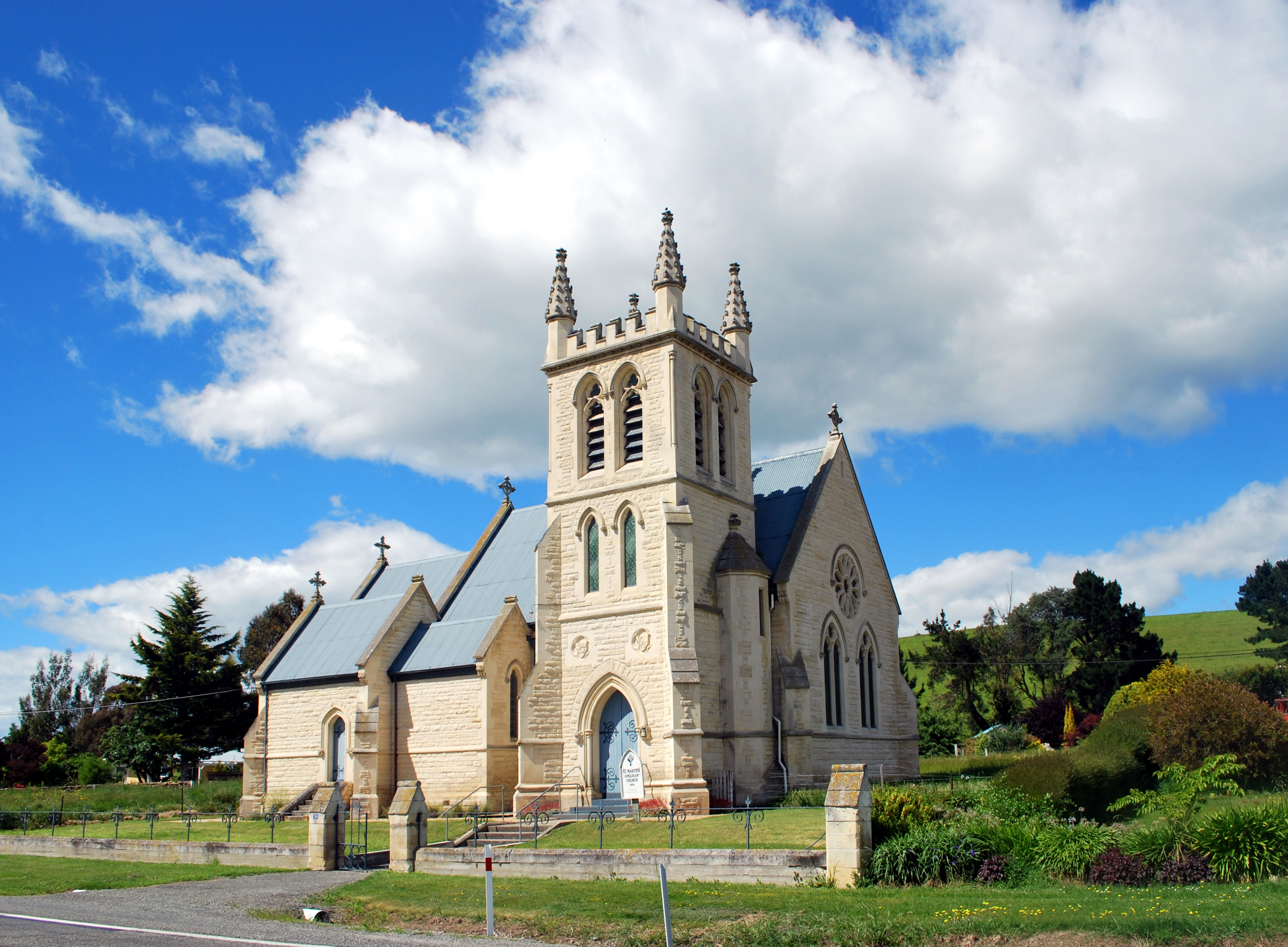
St. Martin's Anglican Church

Duntroon had a population of 93 in the 2023 New Zealand census, a decrease of 3 people (−3.1%) since the 2018 census, and an increase of 18 people (24.0%) since the 2013 census. There were 48 males and 45 females in 42 dwellings. 3.2% of people identified as LGBTIQ+. The median age was 51.1 years (compared with 38.1 years nationally). There were 15 people (16.1%) aged under 15 years, 15 (16.1%) aged 15 to 29, 45 (48.4%) aged 30 to 64, and 21 (22.6%) aged 65 or older.

People could identify as more than one ethnicity. The results were 90.3% European (Pākehā), 12.9% Māori, 3.2% Pasifika, and 3.2% Asian. English was spoken by 100.0%, and other languages by 6.5%. No language could be spoken by 3.2% (e.g. too young to talk). The percentage of people born overseas was 12.9, compared with 28.8% nationally.

Religious affiliations were 19.4% Christian, 3.2% Māori religious beliefs, 3.2% Buddhist, 3.2% New Age, and 3.2% other religions. People who answered that they had no religion were 58.1%, and 9.7% of people did not answer the census question.

Of those at least 15 years old, 9 (11.5%) people had a bachelor's or higher degree, 45 (57.7%) had a post-high school certificate or diploma, and 27 (34.6%) people exclusively held high school qualifications. The median income was $29,500, compared with $41,500 nationally. 3 people (3.8%) earned over $100,000 compared to 12.1% nationally. The employment status of those at least 15 was 39 (50.0%) full-time and 18 (23.1%) part-time.

== Education ==
Duntroon School is a full primary school catering for years 1 to 8, with a roll of 105 students as of July 2026. The school opened in 1879.
