= Clos Ostler =

New Zealand vineyard and wine producer

Entrance to Clos Ostler, with the vineyard on the hillside beyond

Clos Ostler is a family-owned, eight-hectare monopole wine estate near Duntroon in the Waitaki Valley, North Otago, on New Zealand's South Island. Its vineyard occupies a north-facing escarpment of ancient marine limestone in a cool, maritime-influenced climate. Enclosed by a dry-stone wall, it is a physical clos as well as a monopole, a vineyard held under one ownership. Pinot Noir, Chardonnay and Pinot Gris are grown within the single estate, whose wines are drawn from the same bounded site.

The vineyard was first planted in 2002 by Jim Jerram and winemaker Jeff Sinnott, following investigations into the valley's soils and climate begun in 1998. It became one of the pioneering commercial vineyards of the Waitaki Valley wine region, a small, cool-climate region distinguished by limestone, maritime influence and a long ripening season. The estate has remained in production through the region's contraction, with further planting and the introduction of Chardonnay in 2024.

The Roulet Magides family acquired the estate from Jim and Anne Jerram in 2021 through ACG Wines Ltd. The company's initials represent the three Swiss-French brothers Antonio, Connor and Georges, who grew up between Switzerland, Singapore and New Zealand. According to the estate's published family history, their winegrowing heritage is rooted in Peseux, near Neuchâtel in Switzerland. The family's wine interests also include Yarra Yering in Australia's Yarra Valley. At the time of the sale, Jim Jerram welcomed the succession arrangement and the new owners' connections to the Waitaki district, describing the continuation of the estate and its wines as an important part of the founders' legacy.

The estate's Pinot Noir has received national and international recognition. Caroline's Pinot Noir 2021 won the New Zealand Red Trophy, New Zealand Pinot Noir Trophy and North Otago Pinot Noir Trophy at the 2025 International Wine Challenge. EOS Pinot Noir 2022, the inaugural vintage of that selection, received 97 points and the Waitaki Valley's first Platinum medal at the 2026 Decanter World Wine Awards.

== Vineyard and terroir ==
Exposed limestone beneath the vineyard soil at Clos Ostler

Clos Ostler lies on a north-facing limestone escarpment overlooking the lower Waitaki Valley. Its aspect, calcareous ground and cool climate were the principal reasons for the founders' choice of site. The limestone originated in a marine seabed approximately 38 million years old, subsequently uplifted to form part of the valley's present landscape. A dry-stone limestone wall encloses the estate, giving physical expression to the term clos.

Clos Ostler combines a limestone-walled vineyard with monopole ownership: the physical enclosure of a traditional clos and the management of the whole vineyard under one family. Its enclosure follows the tradition of the Burgundian clos. In an account of a 2011 visit, wine writer Tom Cannavan described it as a "'clos' in the Burgundian mould", recording that the surrounding limestone wall had been built by local craftsman Roy Stringer.

The valley lies between the Southern Alps and the Pacific Ocean. Maritime influence distinguishes it from the more continental conditions of Central Otago. Relatively warm summers and long, dry autumns allow an extended ripening season in an otherwise cool climate; frost remains a risk at both ends of that season. Across the region, vineyards occupy weathered limestone slopes and free-draining river gravels.

=== Soils ===
Within the New Zealand Soil Classification, Rendzic Melanic soils are defined by limestone, calcareous sedimentary rock or calcareous rock debris at shallow depth. They form a group within the Melanic soil order, which collectively covers about 1 per cent of New Zealand. Manaaki Whenua describes Melanic soils as having dark, well-structured topsoils and high base saturation, with high exchangeable calcium or magnesium.

The founders regarded the soil as central to the vineyard's potential. In New Zealand Winegrowers' 2020 profile, Sinnott described it as "perhaps one of the most viticulturally significant soils in New Zealand".

Soil analyses published by the estate give a pH of 6.9, total base saturation of 97 per cent and calcium saturation of 89 per cent for the Ostler Block. For the Kairos Block, the corresponding figures are pH 6.7, base saturation of 93 per cent and calcium saturation of 83 per cent.

Base saturation expresses the proportion of the soil's cation-exchange capacity occupied by calcium, magnesium, potassium and sodium. Calcium saturation measures the share occupied by calcium. These measurements therefore describe exchangeable cations rather than the percentage of calcium carbonate in the soil by mass.

The estate describes its limestone-derived soils as free-draining and relatively low in fertility. It assesses individual parcels by their soil depth, aspect, wind exposure and water availability alongside the soil chemistry.

=== Regional setting ===
Clos Ostler's development preceded the registration of the Waitaki Valley North Otago / Waitaki Valley geographical indication on 3 December 2018. The vineyard was among the valley's pioneering commercial plantings, in a region described in 2013 as New Zealand's newest wine region. Other producers associated with the region include Valli, Forrest Wines, Q Wine and River-T Estate Wines.

A 2017 profile of Ostler reported approximately 100 hectares under vine across the Waitaki wine region. New Zealand Winegrowers' Vineyard Report 2026 recorded 49 planted hectares and 45 producing hectares for Waitaki in 2025; its forecasts for 2026 were 46 planted hectares and 43 producing hectares. The report distinguishes all planted vines from vines producing a crop, including fruit that is not harvested.

Clos Ostler's continued development took place against this regional contraction and the difficulties of cool-climate production. In 2021, New Zealand Winegrower described the founders' two decades of work, the challenges of low yields and attracting investment, and the recognition achieved by Caroline's Pinot Noir. Subsequent development included the 2024 vineyard expansion and the introduction of Chardonnay, followed by the IWC trophies and Decanter Platinum award in 2025 and 2026.

== History ==
Limestone gate pillar at Clos Ostler

=== Establishment ===
Jerram and Sinnott began assessing the viticultural potential of the lower Waitaki Valley in 1998. Their investigation included climatic information from three weather stations before the land near Duntroon was purchased in 2001. The vineyard takes its name from Jerram's great-grandfather William Ostler, who arrived in the district from Yorkshire in the 1850s.

The first Pinot Noir vines were planted in 2002, followed by further Pinot Noir and Pinot Gris over the next two years. Frost, cool growing conditions and low yields complicated the vineyard's development. Early frost protection included the use of helicopters, followed by the installation of frost machines. The founders' work formed part of the early commercial development of winegrowing in the valley.

The first vintage was produced in 2004. The late growing season was both a defining feature of the site and a practical challenge: Pinot Noir could remain on the vine into May, exposed to frost and late rain. A 2017 account recorded yields of four tonnes per hectare as a good result under those conditions.

=== Family ownership ===
In 2021, the vineyard and associated brands were acquired from Jim and Anne Jerram by ACG Wines Ltd.

ACG takes its name from Antonio, Connor and Georges Roulet Magides. The estate's family account describes the brothers' Swiss-French background, their upbringing between Switzerland, Singapore and New Zealand, and their connection with the Burgundian vineyard traditions reflected in Clos Ostler's plantings and stone enclosure.

The Roulet Magides family's winegrowing history is rooted in Peseux, in French-speaking Switzerland. The estate's director and family representative, Connor Andrés Roulet Magides, identifies the Peseux winegrower Paul Albert Roulet as his great-great-grandfather in his published family account.

Paul-Albert Roulet kept vineyard observations spanning 1887 to 1943. His notebooks were subsequently used in a 1949 University of Neuchâtel study examining the relationship between local temperatures, vine flowering, harvest dates and yields. In his account of the family's contemporary wine interests, Connor Andrés Roulet Magides dates its involvement in Yarra Yering to 2009 and describes its approach to Clos Ostler as a continuation of vineyard care, restrained winemaking and attention to individual sites.

The estate's history records the addition of 1.5 hectares of Pinot Noir and Chardonnay in 2024, together with the production of its first Chardonnay that year. By 2025, the vineyard covered eight hectares.

== Viticulture and winemaking ==
The vineyard is planted primarily to Pinot Noir, with Chardonnay and Pinot Gris also grown within the estate. The producer describes the site as dry-grown, managed block by block and harvested by hand. Picking decisions take account of variety, ripeness and the conditions of each vintage. The five Pinot Noir selections are Dijon clones 115, 667 and 777, UCD6 and Abel.

Viticulture is overseen by Timbo Deaker of vineyard consultancy Viticultura. Sarah-Kate and Dan Dineen, the owners and winemakers of Maude Wines in Wānaka, make the wines. Their work at Clos Ostler includes both Pinot Noir and Chardonnay.

The estate describes its approach as minimal intervention, with vineyard and cellar decisions guided by the conditions of each growing season.

Clonal lots remain separate through fermentation and maturation, with blending decisions made after approximately ten months. The estate has used tight-grain French oak from Tonnellerie Taransaud since 2022; the proportion of new oak varies by wine and vintage.

The vineyard's Pinot Noir can develop small berries with a high proportion of skins to juice, requiring careful management of the fermenting cap to control extraction. Growing conditions in Waitaki differ from those in Wānaka despite their similar latitude.

=== Production and releases ===
Clos Ostler describes itself as a micro-producer. Individual wines are produced in small quantities, with some bottlings limited to a few hundred cases. Earlier vintages retained at the estate are also offered as library releases.

== Wines and characteristics ==
=== Pinot Noir ===
Caroline's Pinot Noir brings together the vineyard's five Pinot Noir selections—115, 667, 777, UCD6 and Abel—as an expression of the whole site and season. EOS is selected principally from clones 667 and 777, with a smaller contribution from Abel, for perfume, structure and ageing potential. Waitaki Pinot Noir is produced in selected vintages as a separate selection centred on freshness. All three are grown within the same monopole.

EOS was introduced with the 2022 vintage, made from hand-harvested fruit and matured for eleven months in Taransaud barrels made from Tronçais oak.

Clos Ostler was identified as the leading producer based in the Waitaki Valley in a 2013 WineAlign survey of New Zealand's top producers. The survey described the wines as delicate, refined and perfumed, distinguishing their style from Central Otago Pinot Noir.

Published assessments have emphasised the Pinot Noirs' perfume, fine acidity, tannin structure and capacity to develop in bottle. Caroline's Pinot Noir 2022 received a 95-point review describing red-fruit and floral character, supple tannins and a drinking window extending ten years from 2025. EOS Pinot Noir 2022 received a separate 94-point review highlighting its structure, acidity and ageing potential.

Caroline's Pinot Noir 2021 was described in a review on JancisRobinson.com as "one of those wines that stops you in your tracks".

=== Chardonnay ===
The first Clos Ostler Chardonnay was made in 2024 from clone 95 and fermented in barrel. For newer Chardonnay plantings, Deaker selected clone 107, also known as the Calera clone, for its fruit set under Waitaki conditions.

The 2024 Chardonnay was made from hand-harvested fruit, whole-bunch pressed and fermented with wild yeasts in French oak barrels.

Development of the Chardonnay programme has included work on oak selection and malolactic fermentation, with the aim of building texture while retaining acidity and site character.

The Chardonnay received 95 points for its inaugural 2024 vintage and 96 points for the 2025 vintage in published reviews. The assessments highlighted lively fruit, creamy texture and flinty character in 2024, followed by balanced acidity, texture and a sustained finish in 2025. Citrus, nectarine and floral aromas appeared in both reviews.

Further assessments of the 2024 Chardonnay included 96 points from Wine Orbit, 95 from The Real Review and 94 from Cameron Douglas. The Real Review described the inaugural release as "A wonderful debut", linking its ripeness to the warm El Niño season and noting the acidity that balanced its texture.

=== Pinot Gris ===
Audrey's Pinot Gris is the estate's Pinot Gris bottling. The variety was planted during the vineyard's early development, following the first Pinot Noir vines, and remains part of the estate alongside Pinot Noir and Chardonnay.

== Recognition ==
By 2021, Caroline's Pinot Noir had received six consecutive International Wine Challenge gold medals. At the 2025 competition, Caroline's Pinot Noir 2021 scored 96 points and received the New Zealand Red Trophy, New Zealand Pinot Noir Trophy and North Otago Pinot Noir Trophy.

EOS Pinot Noir 2022 received 97 points and a Platinum medal at the 2026 Decanter World Wine Awards. In its report on that year's results, Decanter identified the award as the Waitaki Valley's first Platinum.

A winery guide published in Verve in December 2020 described Caroline's Pinot Noir 2018 as "one of NZ's best kept secrets", highlighting the wine's awards and the estate's limestone setting.

=== Published selections ===
Caroline's Pinot Noir 2020 and 2021 were both awarded gold medals in Dish magazine's "The Best Pinot Noirs in New Zealand 2025" tasting, published in May 2025. The magazine identified Clos Ostler among the producers with multiple successful entries. Its assessment of the 2021 highlighted complexity and generous texture, while the 2020 was noted for delicacy, savoury detail and fine tannins.

In August 2026, Decanter included EOS Pinot Noir 2022 in its international selection of 15 top-scoring Pinot Noirs from that year's Decanter World Wine Awards. It was one of four New Zealand wines featured, alongside wines from France, Australia, Chile and the United States. The tasting assessment emphasised its structure, acidity and long, savoury finish.

=== Burgundy comparisons and blind tastings ===
Published assessments of Caroline's Pinot Noir have repeatedly drawn comparisons with Burgundy, particularly Chambolle-Musigny.

Matt Kramer compared Caroline's Pinot Noir 2010 to "a fine Chambolle-Musigny", a description reproduced in Geoff Kelly's review of that vintage. The comparison concerned the wine's aromatic character and complexity.

Fine Wine Delivery's November–December 2020 catalogue compared Caroline's Pinot Noir 2016 to Chambolle-Musigny, emphasising its fragrance, concentration, elegance and silky texture.

For Caroline's Pinot Noir 2022, Fine Wine Delivery used the description "Grand Cru Burgundy equivalent" and again compared its style to Chambolle-Musigny. Its tasting note highlighted the combination of concentration and delicacy, supple tannins, fine acidity and savoury, saline character.

In a published account of a private blind tasting at Château-d'Œx, Switzerland, the estate reported that EOS was served among predominantly Grand Cru Burgundies, including Domaine de la Romanée-Conti Échezeaux, Clos de Tart, Clos des Lambrays, La Grande Rue and Domaine Faiveley Mazis-Chambertin. According to the account, the participants included collectors, wine professionals, family and friends, and EOS was assessed among the leading wines of the evening, alongside the Domaine de la Romanée-Conti Échezeaux.

== Vineyard accommodation ==
The estate introduced three off-grid vineyard suites above the vines in 2026. The suites overlook the Waitaki Valley, and estate wine tastings formed part of the visitor experience described in an October 2026 travel report.

== See also ==
- New Zealand wine
- Waitaki Valley wine region
