= NZR RM class (Clayton) =

NZ RM class Clayton
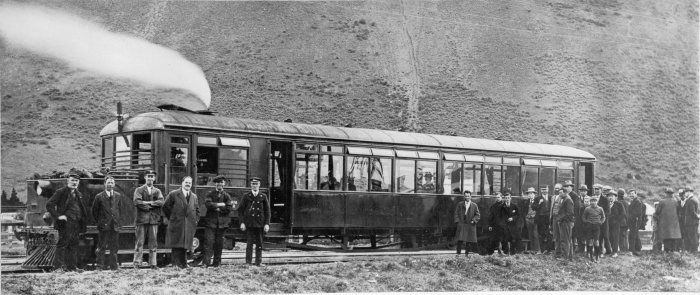
- Clayton steam railcar on a trial run at Kurow circa 1927. A P Godber Collection, Alexander Turnbull Library.
Type and origin
- Power type: Steam (Passenger capacity: 52)
- Builder: Clayton Carriage and Wagon of England
- Build date: 1926
Specifications
- Gauge: 3 ft 6 in (1,067 mm)
- Fuel type: Coal
- Boiler pressure: 275 psi (1,896 kPa)
Performance figures
- Maximum speed: 30 mph (48 km/h)
Career
- Operators: New Zealand Railways
- Number in class: 1
- Locale: Kurow Branch
- Disposition: Scrapped

The NZR RM class Clayton steam rail motor was a unique railcar that was operated by New Zealand Railways (NZR) for New Zealand's national rail network and one of only two steam railcars to operate in New Zealand - the other being 1925's RM class Sentinel-Cammell.

== Background ==
In the early 20th century, NZR began experiments with railcars as an option to replace unprofitable regional locomotive-hauled carriage expresses and to provide efficient passenger service on rural branch lines that were served solely by slow mixed trains that carried both goods and passengers. Such mixed trains had slow schedules as they had to load and unload freight regularly, making their stops longer than passenger service would normally require.

== Construction ==
Built in 1926 by Clayton Carriage and Wagon of Lincoln, England and assembled at NZR's Petone Workshops, the railcar could seat up to 52 people and its steam boiler could generate a pressure of 275 psi. It could be driven from either end and was capable of hauling a wagon or two of freight, and its airy, open design proved popular with passengers. It was not popular with crews or mechanics. Before it even commenced revenue operations, a heavier firebox and larger boiler had to be installed, and its poor reliability necessitated regular repairs. Due to these issues, no additional examples of the railcar were built.

== In service ==
After its assembly and improvements were completed, the railcar was transferred to the South Island and took over passenger duties on the Kurow Branch, running from Kurow to Oamaru and return six days a week. Previously, the line's passenger services had been worked by mixed trains that carried both passengers and goods and thus would regularly stop for extended periods to load and unload freight. The steam railcar proved to be a vast improvement for passengers, as its schedule was an hour quicker, at just 1 hour 45 minutes. It could maintain a speed of 30 mph (48 km/h) on straight, flat track, but when presented with steep grades or sharp curves, its speed would drop to 6–14 mph (9.7–22.5 km/h). One quirk of its operations was that farmers' dogs had to be carried in dog boxes for the duration of the trip rather than lying at their master's feet; as the railcar operated on a rural branch line, this policy was not greeted with enthusiasm.

== Withdrawal ==
On 10 November 1928, a regular locomotive-hauled passenger train replaced the railcar, but this was not the end of its life. It was assigned to run various services in Otago and Southland for a number of years. In 1929 it worked suburban services between Invercargill and Bluff on the Bluff Branch. From 1930 it was only used intermittently, and after eleven years of operation, it was withdrawn in 1937 and dismantled in the Invercargill yard.

Railcar technology was improving by the 1930s. The Vulcan railcars (which had a lavatory) were ordered not long after the Clayton retired, and there was little need or economic justification for an older, somewhat unreliable steam-powered railcar that was unsuitable for the rugged terrain of many lines in New Zealand. It was not preserved. Its sandbox was appropriated for use as a back sand gear on A^{B} 810.
