= Elephant Rocks (New Zealand) =

Rock formation in New Zealand

Coordinates: 44.8935°S 170.6562°E

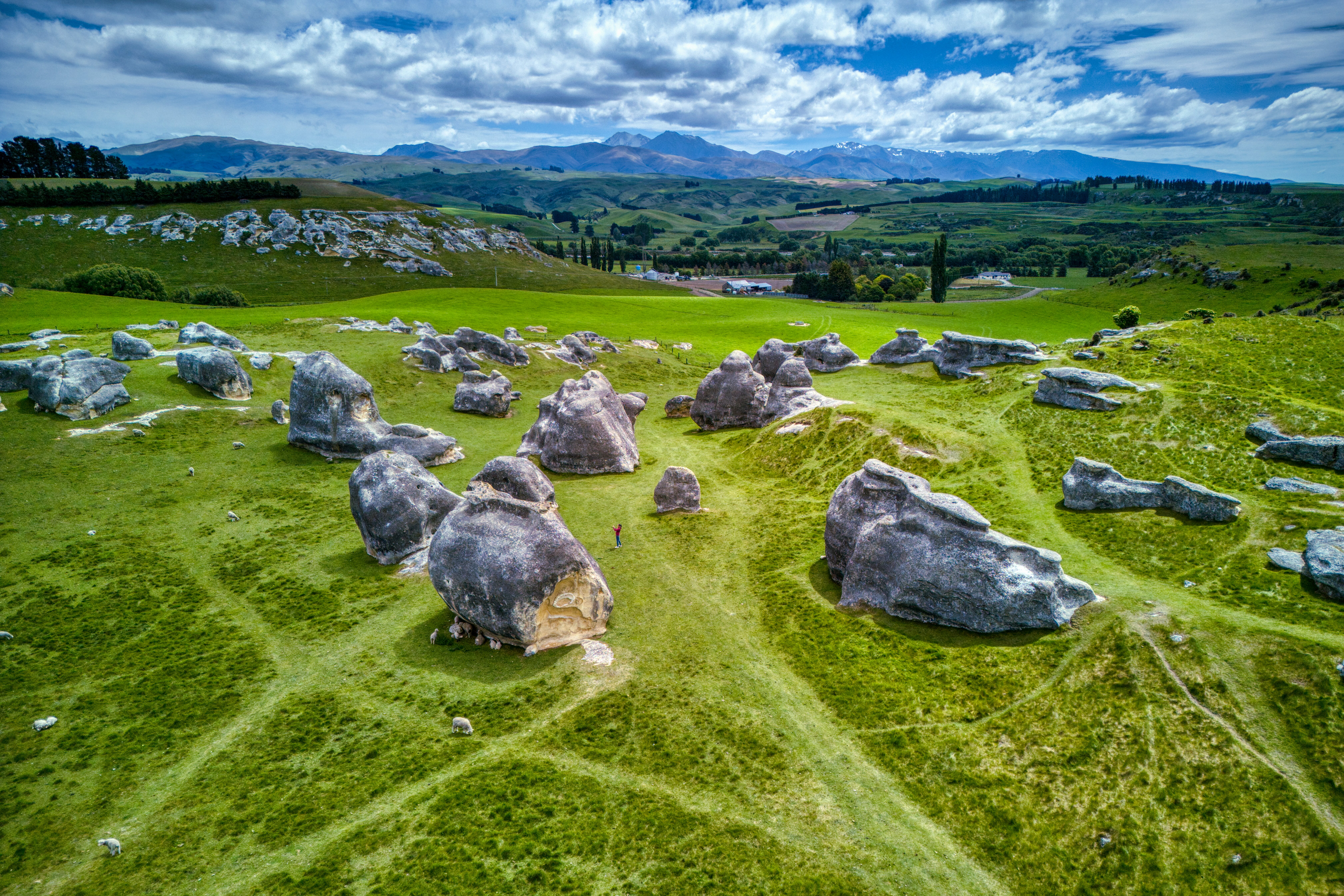
View across the Elephant Rocks area

The Elephant Rocks near Duntroon in the Canterbury region of New Zealand, are a collection of large weathered limestone rocks. They are located on a private farm 5 kilometres (3 mi) south of Duntroon, in the Maerewhenua Valley. The wider area around Duntroon is known for its interesting geology and preserved fossils.

The Elephant Rocks are the weathered remnants of the Otekaike Limestone formation which lies above the Oligocene Kokoamu Greensand.

The rock formations of the Elephant Rocks vary from 1–10 metres (3–33 ft) across and are naturally scattered around a grass paddock on a gentle hillside over an area of about 200 metres (660 ft) across. The rocks themselves are rounded and pockmarked from weathering, but do not specifically resemble elephant shapes. The rocks are in fact named after a circus elephant that died there in 1868 while being walked from Dunedin to Christchurch; the elephant died from eating poisonous tutu berries. Its skeleton was sold to the Colonial Museum, and the area was afterwards known as Elephant Hill, and later Elephant Rocks.

The pasture is part of a private farm, and sheep may be present. Access is permitted via a 5-minute walk across the farmland from opposite a parking bay on the Island Cliff-Duntroon Road. The Alps to Ocean Cycle Trail passes the site.

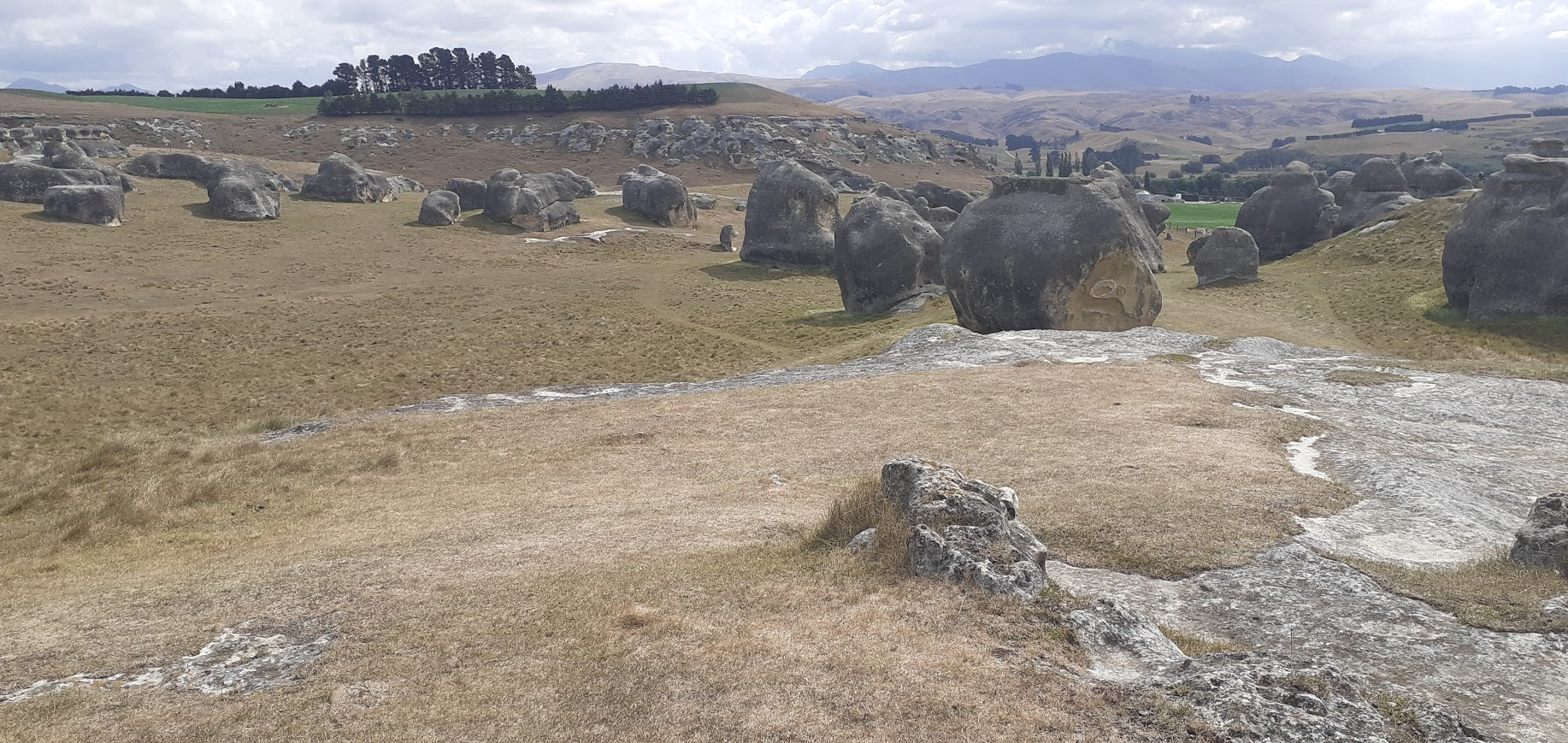
Elephant Rocks

The Elephant Rocks area has been used as a filming location for the first Chronicles of Narnia movie in 2005 when it was transformed into Aslan's camp.
