= Kurow Branch =

Overview
- Other names: Awamoko Branch; Hakataramea Branch
- Status: Closed
- Locale: Otago, New Zealand
- Termini: Pukeuri; Kurow
- Stations: 15

Service
- Type: Heavy Rail
- System: New Zealand Government Railways (NZGR)
- Services: 1

History
- Opened: 1 December 1875
- Extended to Hakataramea: July 1881
- Closed beyond Kurow: 14 July 1930
- Closed: 5 June 1983

Technical
- Number of tracks: Single
- Character: Rural
- Track gauge: 3 ft 6 in (1,067 mm)

Map

The Kurow Branch (also known as the Hakataramea Branch) was part of New Zealand's national rail network. In the North Otago region of the South Island, it was built in the 1870s to open up the land behind Oamaru for development, and closed in June 1983.

== Construction ==
The branch started as a tramway when the Awamoko Tramway Company was formed in 1873. Construction of a tramway from the Main South Line at Pukeuri to Duntroon commenced the next year with approval from the Otago provincial government. In 1875, after the realisation that tramway standards were not sufficient for the line's purposes, an upgrade to railway standards commenced. Almost everything that had already been constructed had to be rebuilt; the rails were too light, the sleepers were too small, and insufficient ballast had been laid. Nonetheless, only a fortnight after reconstruction began, the official opening ceremony took place on 1 December 1875. Freight trains did not begin running for another three weeks, and passengers were not carried until 16 August 1876, when the reconstruction programme had been completed. The line had not reached Duntroon; it terminated on the opposite (east) bank of the Maerewhenua River due to bridging difficulties.

The Duntroon and Hakataramea Railway Company was formed in 1878 after the 1877 District Railways Act was passed, with the intention of building a railway from Duntroon to Kurow and then further up the Waitaki Valley. Construction commenced in 1879, the Maerewhenua River was bridged on 2 July 1881, and when the Waitaki River was bridged on 7 November 1881 the line was completed to Hakataramea, 1.76 km beyond Kurow by rail on the northern side of the Waitaki. There were plans to extend to a proposed town that was to have 10,000 residents, but the town never came to fruition and Hakataramea remained the terminus. The Duntroon and Hakataramea Railway Company did not purchase its own equipment; the branch was always operated by the New Zealand Railways Department. This arrangement lasted for over three years while the company and government disputed ownership, primarily due to the fact the line terminated at Hakataramea rather than being built to the full extent of original plans. The government purchased the line in April 1885 and charged a tariff beyond Duntroon until 1897.

Further construction took place in 1928, when the Public Works Department built 6.4 kilometres of railway from Kurow to the site of the Waitaki hydro-electric dam. This line was never owned or operated by NZR, though NZR trains did occasionally use it, when a Public Works Department locomotive took over from Kurow. Works and freight services began on 20 December 1928 and passengers were carried from 25 February 1929.

== Stations ==
The following stations were on the branch. In brackets is the distance from the junction at Pukeuri:

- Papakaio (6.94 km)
- Gibsons (10.18 km) - closed in 1981
- Peebles (12.75 km) - gravel pits west of the station.
- Aitchisons (17.52 km)
- Uxbridge (19.85 km) - up and down trains used to cross here
- Black Point (26.01 km) - closed in 1961
- Bortons (28.72 km) - closed in 1972
- Maerewhenua Siding (34.4 km) - "Duntroon" terminus before the Maerewhenua River was bridged. Sometimes spelt "Marewhenua".
- Duntroon (35.5 km)
- Waikaura (39.75 km)
- Otekaieke (45.97 km)
- Strachans (52.33 km) - closed in 1978
- Hilles (55.73 km)
- Kurow (58.57 km)
- Hakataramea (60.33 km) - also spelt "Hakateramea".

After closure to Hakataramea, the end of the branch was just beyond Kurow station, 59.22 km from Pukeuri.

When the line closed, only Papakaio, Duntroon, Otekaieke and Kurow were still open.

== Operation ==
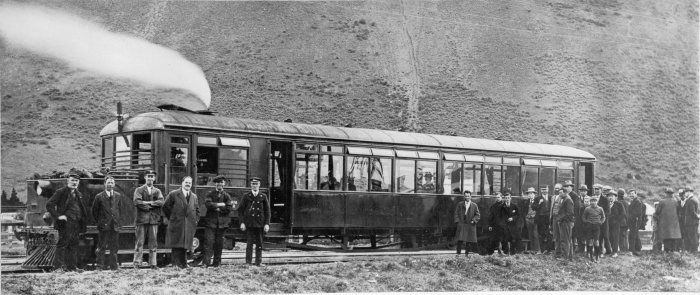
The Clayton steam railcar on a trial run at Kurow circa 1927. A P Godber Collection, Alexander Turnbull Library.

Operations in its first few decades were typical of many rural branch lines. A single mixed train departed Kurow for Oamaru in the morning and returned in the late afternoon, taking roughly three hours each way. In 1926, the branch was the location for the trial of one of New Zealand's two steam railcars, the Clayton steam railcar, taking 1 hour and 45 minutes between Oamaru and Kurow. It did not prove popular and it was replaced by a passenger train hauled by a steam locomotive on 10 November 1928 running to the railcar's schedule, but this was withdrawn on 12 July 1930 due to the Great Depression. Special passenger trains still ran on occasions, notably in 1931 for sightseers along the Public Works Department (PWD) line to the under-construction Waitaki Dam. For a few years, the PWD used its own rolling stock for school children at Kurow. This service ceased when the PWD line closed in the mid-1930s; it formally closed in late 1936 and the track was removed in April 1937. NZR had closed its section from Kurow to Hakataramea on 14 July 1930.

Until the 1960s, the branch was operated by steam locomotives, initially the F and T classes, later the W^{F} and W^{W}, and from the late 1940s the A and A^{B}. By the 1940s, traditional traffic such as livestock and agricultural supplies were declining as competition from road transport increased, and the primary freight became goods for the Upper Waitaki Hydro Scheme. On 25 March 1947, passenger services were withdrawn and the mixed trains became goods only. In the late 1960s, the branch was dieselised when the DJ class was introduced and trains were reduced to thrice weekly, then just Mondays and Thursdays. Its function was as the railhead for dam construction, and even with just two trains a week sometimes one was cancelled. When the project was completed in the early 1980s, the line ceased to have a reason to exist and it closed on 5 June 1983, with the final train two days later to collect rolling stock.

== The branch today ==
The formation is visible for much of its length, and some crossing gates, culverts, and bridge piles remain. The combined road/rail bridge over the Waitaki River to Hakataramea remained as a road-only bridge until 2014, when a new bridge was opened and the original one dismantled. Loading banks or platforms are still at Papakaio and Uxbridge, and Otekaieke's station sign stands in a field. Kurow station building has been modified by a farmer for private use. The most significant remnant is in Duntroon, where the station building has been preserved as a community crafts centre and a base for farmers' markets, and a water tank stands nearby in good condition.
