= State Highway 84 (New Zealand) =

Road in New Zealand

State Highway 84

Route information
- Maintained by NZ Transport Agency Waka Kotahi
- Length: 1 mi (1.6 km)

Major junctions
- East end: SH 6 (Wanaka Luggate Highway/Albert Town Lake Hawea Road) near Albert Town, New Zealand
- West end: Ardmore Street/Brownston Street at Wānaka

Location
- Country: New Zealand

Highway system
- New Zealand state highways; Motorways and expressways; List
← SH 83	→ SH 85

State Highway 84 (SH 84) is a South Island state highway in New Zealand. It connects the holiday resort town of Wānaka to SH 6, the main north–south highway servicing the western part of the South Island.

== Route ==
Known as Wanaka Luggate Highway, it is a two-lane road for its entire length. The road begins at SH 6 to the south of Albert Town and proceeds in a westerly direction past Puzzling World to descend into the township of Wānaka.

== Route history ==
Before being re-gazetted as SH 84 in 1998, the road formed part of State Highway 89, more well known as the Crown Range Road.

== See also ==
- List of New Zealand state highways
