= Maerewhenua River =

River in New Zealand

Coordinates: 44°51′S 170°42′E

The Maerewhenua River, also known as the Marewhenua River, is a small river in the Otago region of New Zealand's South Island. It is located in North Otago and acts as a tributary of the Waitaki River, which forms the border between Otago and Canterbury.

The river flows to the east of the small town of Duntroon. When the Kurow Branch, a branch line railway, was under construction in the 1870s, the river posed construction difficulties and the line terminated on the east bank for over five years until a bridge was successfully completed in mid-1881.
