= Pukeuri =

- Rural locality
- Interactive map of Pukeuri
- Coordinates: 45.033957°S 171.02608°E
- Country: New Zealand
- Region: Otago
- Territorial authority: Waitaki District
- Ward: Corriedale Ward
- Electorates: Waitaki; Te Tai Tonga (Māori)

Government
  - Territorial authority: Waitaki District Council
  - Regional council: Otago Regional Council
  - Mayor of Waitaki: Melanie Tavendale
  - Waitaki MP: Miles Anderson
  - Te Tai Tonga MP: Mananui Ramsden

Area
  - Total: 19.68 km^{2} (7.60 sq mi)

Population (2023 Census)
  - Total: 186
  - Density: 9.45/km^{2} (24.5/sq mi)
- Time zone: UTC+12 (New Zealand Standard Time)
  - Summer (DST): UTC+13 (New Zealand Daylight Time)
- Postcode: 9493

Pukeuri is a settlement to the north of Oamaru in the North Otago region of New Zealand's South Island. It is located near the coast in the Waitaki District that straddles the border of Otago and Canterbury.

The settlement's major employer is the Alliance abattoir, which is North Otago's biggest employer. A large fire in January 2006 came at the height of the killing season and caused significant disruptions for both workers and customers.

Pukeuri is the location of the junction of State Highways 1 and 83, and it used to be the junction of the Main South Line and Kurow Branch railways as well. The Main South Line still runs through the town, though it no longer caters for passenger traffic. Construction of the branch line began in 1874 and Pukeuri served as the junction until the line's closure in 1983.

A plaque next to State Highway 1 to the north of the settlement (close to the farming community of Hilderthorpe) marks the 45th parallel.

== Demographics ==
Pukeuri locality covers 19.68 km^{2} (7.60 sq mi). It is part of the larger Lower Waitaki statistical area.

Historical population for Pukeuri
Year	Pop.	±% p.a.
1996	204	—
2001	183	−2.15%
2006	153	−3.52%
2013	171	+1.60%
2018	177	+0.69%
2023	186	+1.00%
Populations before 2006 use different boundaries. Source:

Pukeuri had a population of 186 in the 2023 New Zealand census, an increase of 9 people (5.1%) since the 2018 census, and an increase of 15 people (8.8%) since the 2013 census. There were 93 males and 93 females in 66 dwellings. 3.2% of people identified as LGBTIQ+. The median age was 38.4 years (compared with 38.1 years nationally). There were 42 people (22.6%) aged under 15 years, 24 (12.9%) aged 15 to 29, 96 (51.6%) aged 30 to 64, and 18 (9.7%) aged 65 or older.

People could identify as more than one ethnicity. The results were 88.7% European (Pākehā), 9.7% Māori, 4.8% Pasifika, and 4.8% Asian. English was spoken by 96.8%, and other languages by 4.8%. No language could be spoken by 1.6% (e.g. too young to talk). The percentage of people born overseas was 14.5, compared with 28.8% nationally.

Religious affiliations were 32.3% Christian, and 1.6% New Age. People who answered that they had no religion were 58.1%, and 9.7% of people did not answer the census question.

Of those at least 15 years old, 18 (12.5%) people had a bachelor's or higher degree, 81 (56.2%) had a post-high school certificate or diploma, and 42 (29.2%) people exclusively held high school qualifications. The median income was $43,600, compared with $41,500 nationally. 12 people (8.3%) earned over $100,000 compared to 12.1% nationally. The employment status of those at least 15 was 81 (56.2%) full-time and 18 (12.5%) part-time.

=== Lower Waitaki statistical area ===
Lower Waitaki covers 174.18 km^{2} (67.25 sq mi) and had an estimated population of 1,660 as of June 2025, with a population density of 9.5 people per km^{2}.

Historical population for Lower Waitaki
Year	Pop.	±% p.a.
2006	1,047	—
2013	1,299	+3.13%
2018	1,434	+2.00%
2023	1,575	+1.89%
The 2006 population is for a smaller area of 172.93 km^{2}. Source:

Lower Waitaki had a population of 1,575 in the 2023 New Zealand census, an increase of 141 people (9.8%) since the 2018 census, and an increase of 276 people (21.2%) since the 2013 census. There were 801 males and 774 females in 597 dwellings. 1.3% of people identified as LGBTIQ+. The median age was 42.8 years (compared with 38.1 years nationally). There were 333 people (21.1%) aged under 15 years, 213 (13.5%) aged 15 to 29, 765 (48.6%) aged 30 to 64, and 267 (17.0%) aged 65 or older.

People could identify as more than one ethnicity. The results were 87.8% European (Pākehā); 6.5% Māori; 1.7% Pasifika; 8.6% Asian; 0.6% Middle Eastern, Latin American and African New Zealanders (MELAA); and 3.4% other, which includes people giving their ethnicity as "New Zealander". English was spoken by 98.5%, Māori by 0.8%, and other languages by 7.4%. No language could be spoken by 1.3% (e.g. too young to talk). New Zealand Sign Language was known by 0.4%. The percentage of people born overseas was 17.0, compared with 28.8% nationally.

Religious affiliations were 37.1% Christian, 0.2% Hindu, 0.6% Buddhist, 0.4% New Age, and 1.0% other religions. People who answered that they had no religion were 53.5%, and 7.6% of people did not answer the census question.

Of those at least 15 years old, 207 (16.7%) people had a bachelor's or higher degree, 729 (58.7%) had a post-high school certificate or diploma, and 309 (24.9%) people exclusively held high school qualifications. The median income was $44,000, compared with $41,500 nationally. 159 people (12.8%) earned over $100,000 compared to 12.1% nationally. The employment status of those at least 15 was 666 (53.6%) full-time, 210 (16.9%) part-time, and 12 (1.0%) unemployed.
