= State Highway 83 (New Zealand) =

Road in New Zealand

State Highway 83

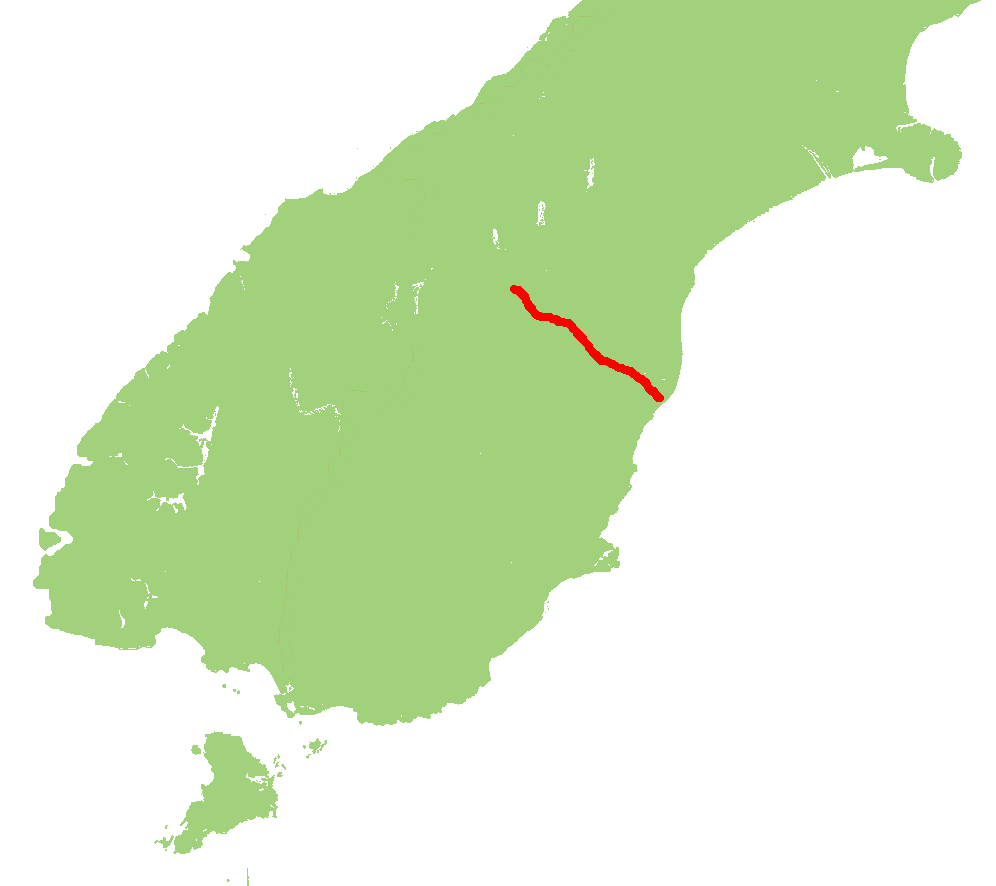

Route information
- Maintained by NZ Transport Agency Waka Kotahi
- Length: 109.4 km (68.0 mi)

Major junctions
- From: SH 8 (Omarama Avenue) at Omarama
- To: SH 1 (Hilderthorpe Pukeuri Road/Pukeuri Oamaru Road) at Pukeuri

Location
- Country: New Zealand
- Primary destinations: Otematata, Kurow, Duntroon.

Highway system
- New Zealand state highways; Motorways and expressways; List
← SH 82	→ SH 84

State Highway 83 (SH 83) is a South Island state highway in New Zealand running up the Waitaki Valley between the settlements of Pukeuri and Omarama. It forms part of the southernmost of the east–west roads crossing the South Island (via Haast Pass).

== Route ==
Since designation, this is the route SH 83 takes.

As Chain Hills Highway, it begins in Omarama and passes through most of the settlement in an easterly direction. Leaving Omarama, the road changes name to Omarama Otematata Road. The road then runs along the banks of the Ahuriri Arm of Lake Benmore and descends into the township of Otematata (turnoff for the Benmore Dam). After Otematata, the road then passes along the southern banks of Lakes Aviemore and Waitaki as well as their respective dams.

The road emerges on the upper Waitaki River floodplain and enters the township of Kurow. Beyond Kurow, the road is all but flat and runs along the southern flanks of the floodplains as well as through Duntroon and Georgetown before crossing a low saddle to descend into Pukeuri.

== Images ==
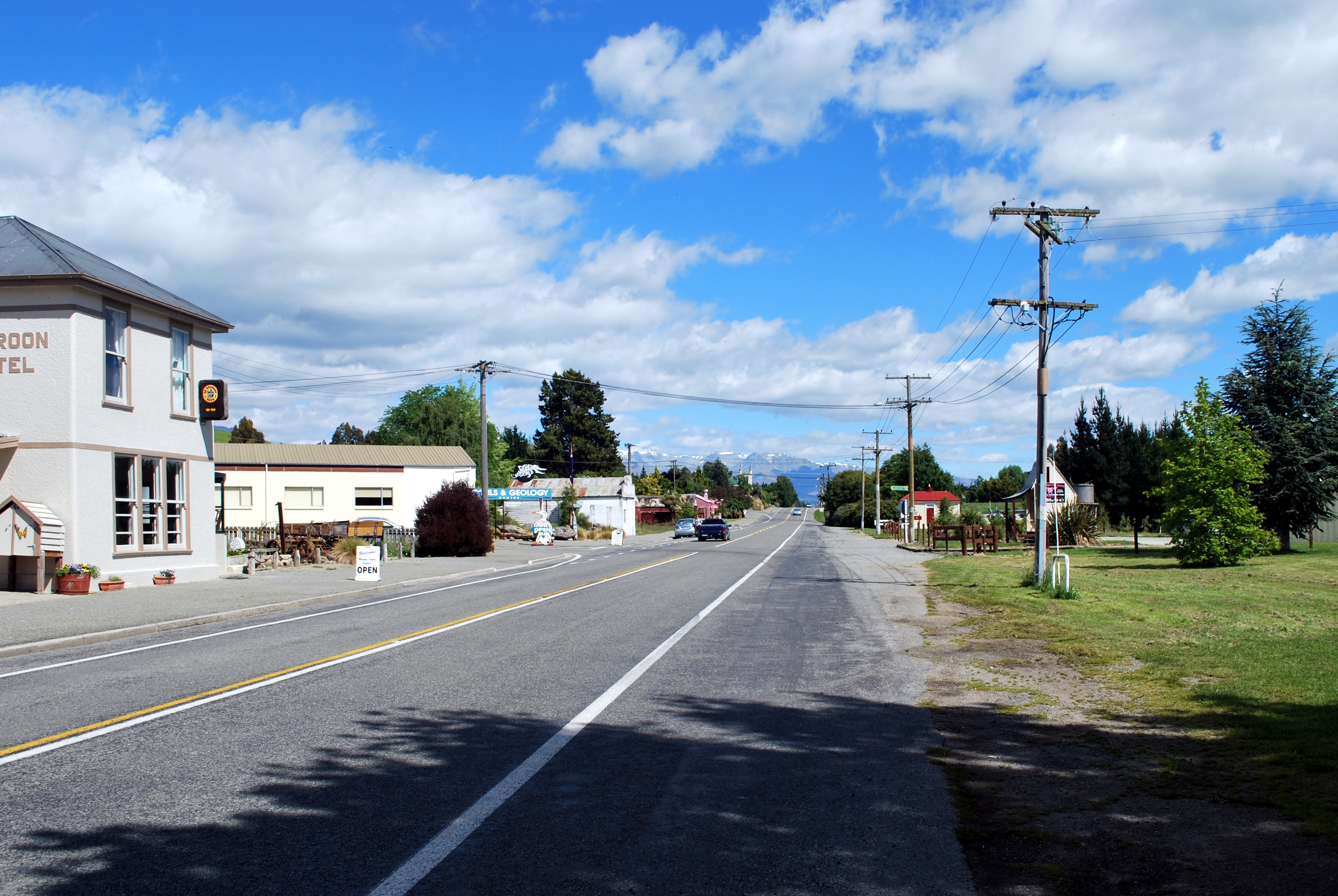
SH 83 through Duntroon

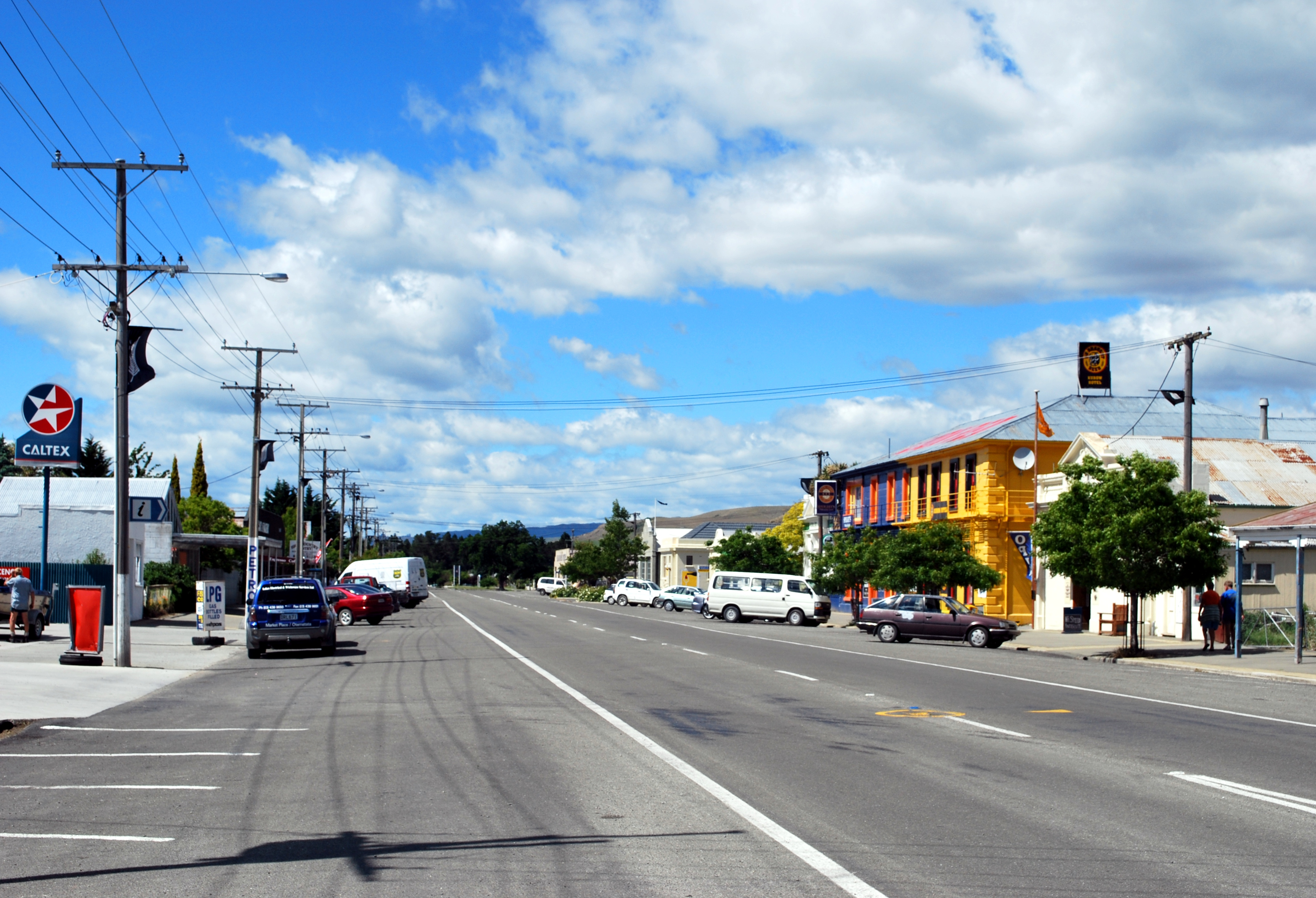
SH 83 through Kurow (facing the coast)

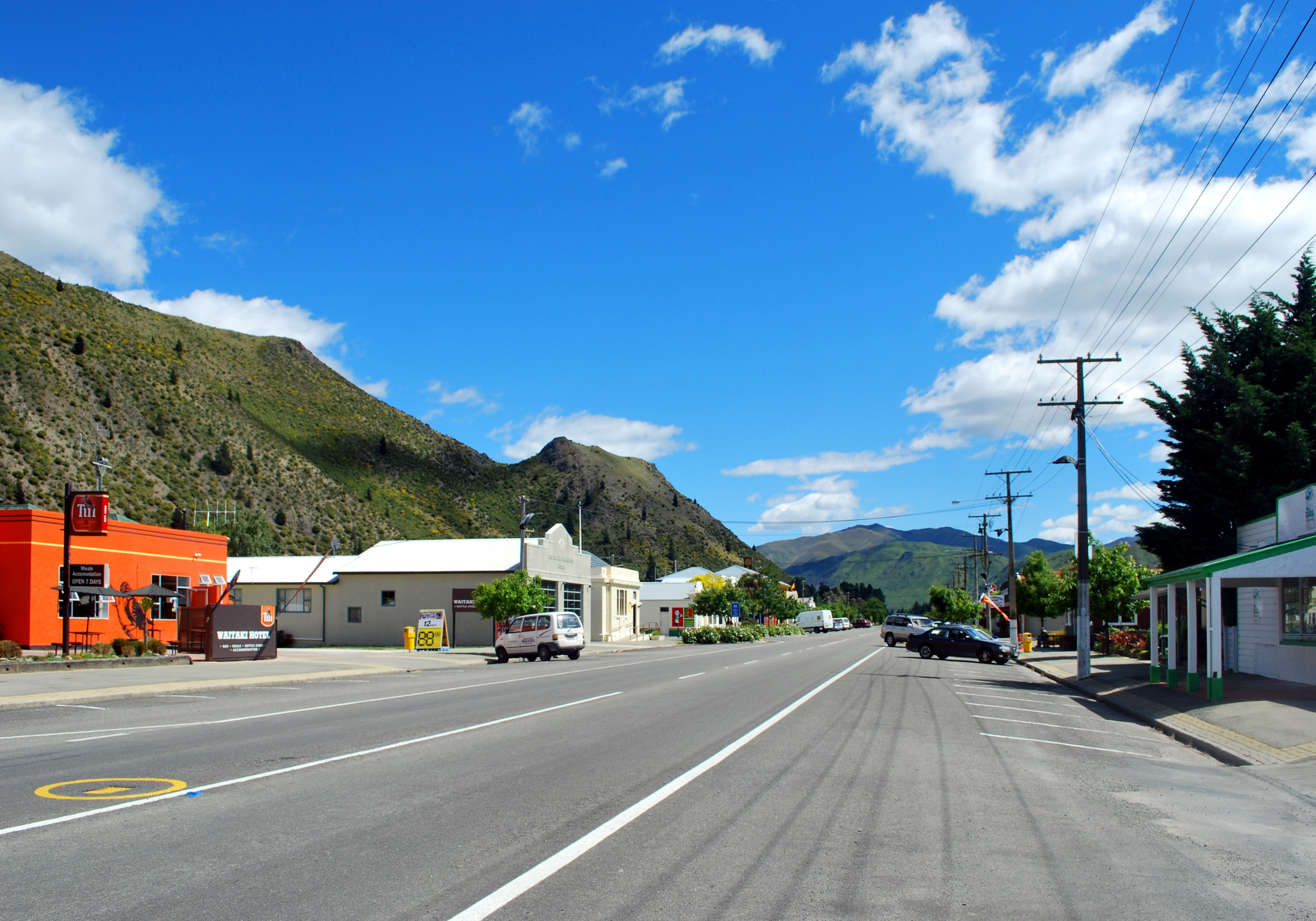
SH 83 through Kurow (facing the alps)

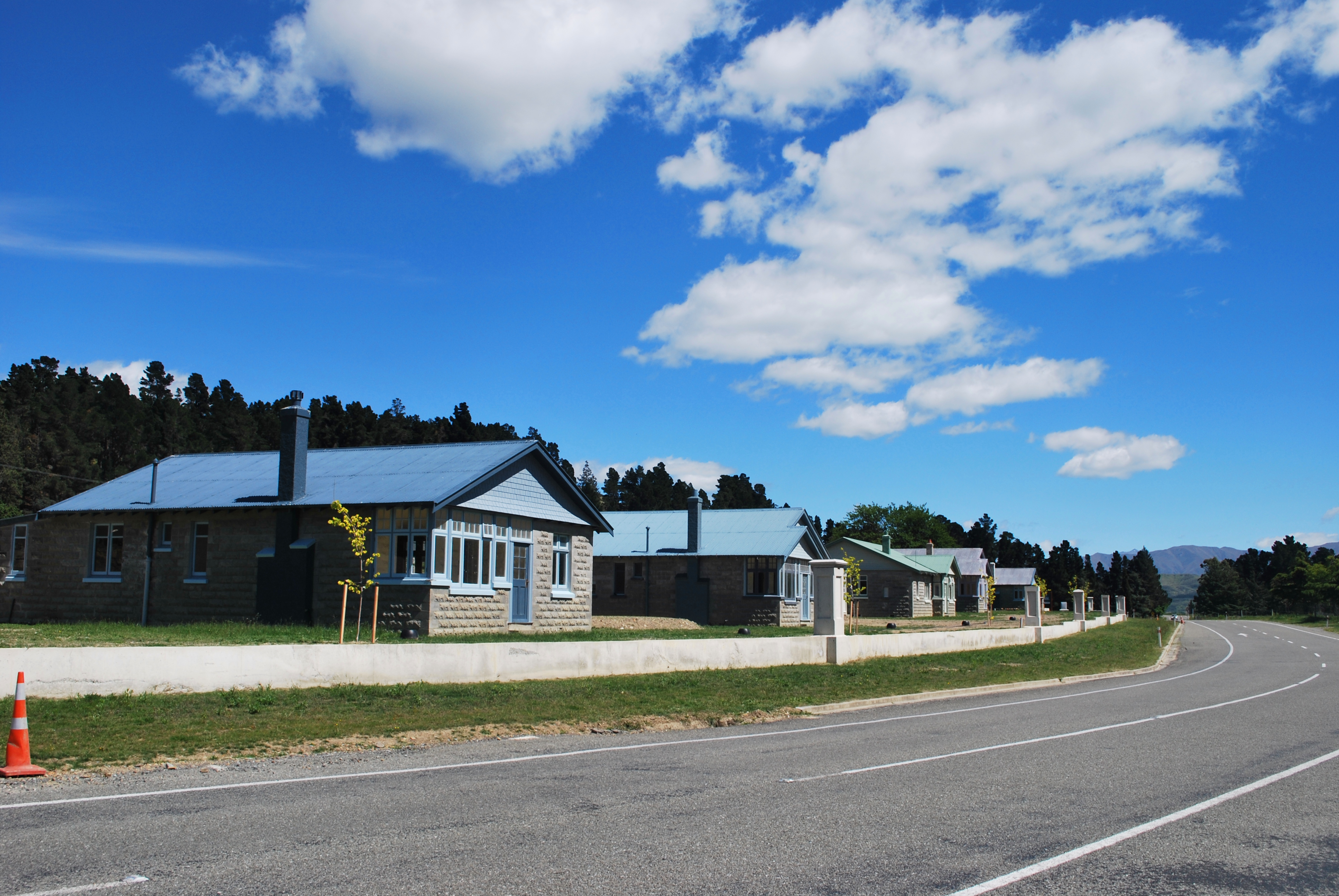
SH 83 passing the Waitaki Dam

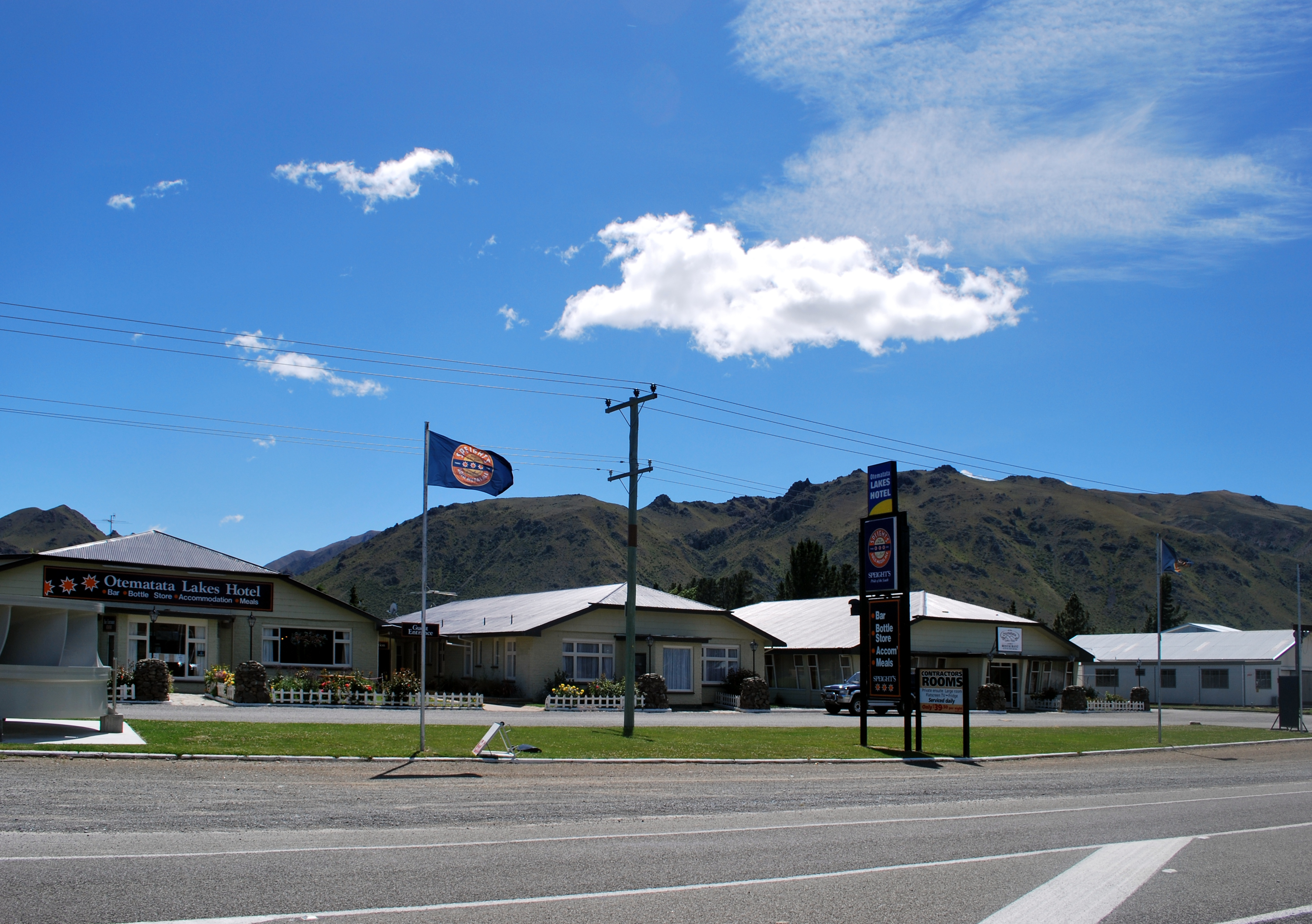
SH 83 passing through Otematata

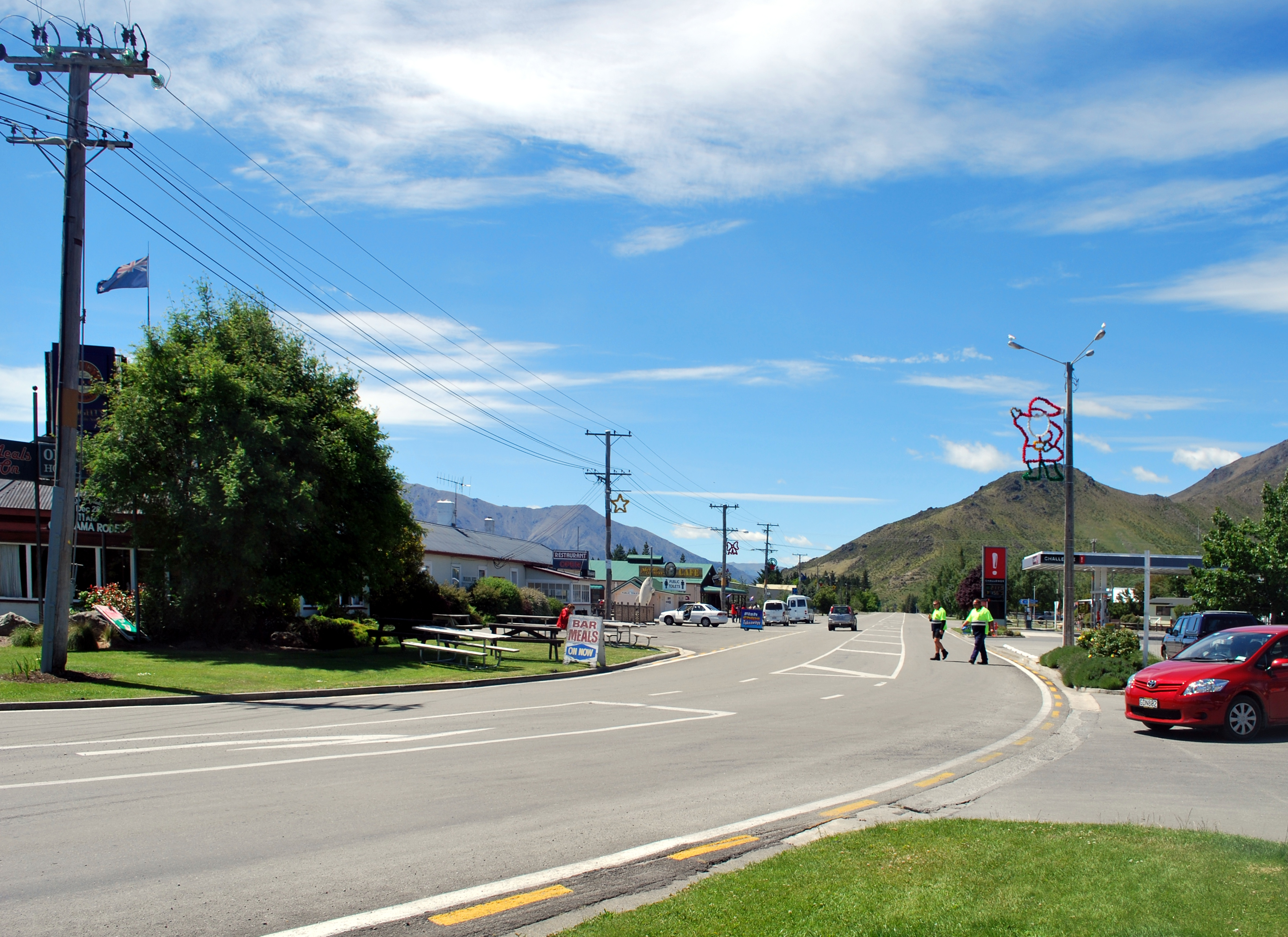
SH 83 near its terminus in Omarama

== See also ==
- List of New Zealand state highways
