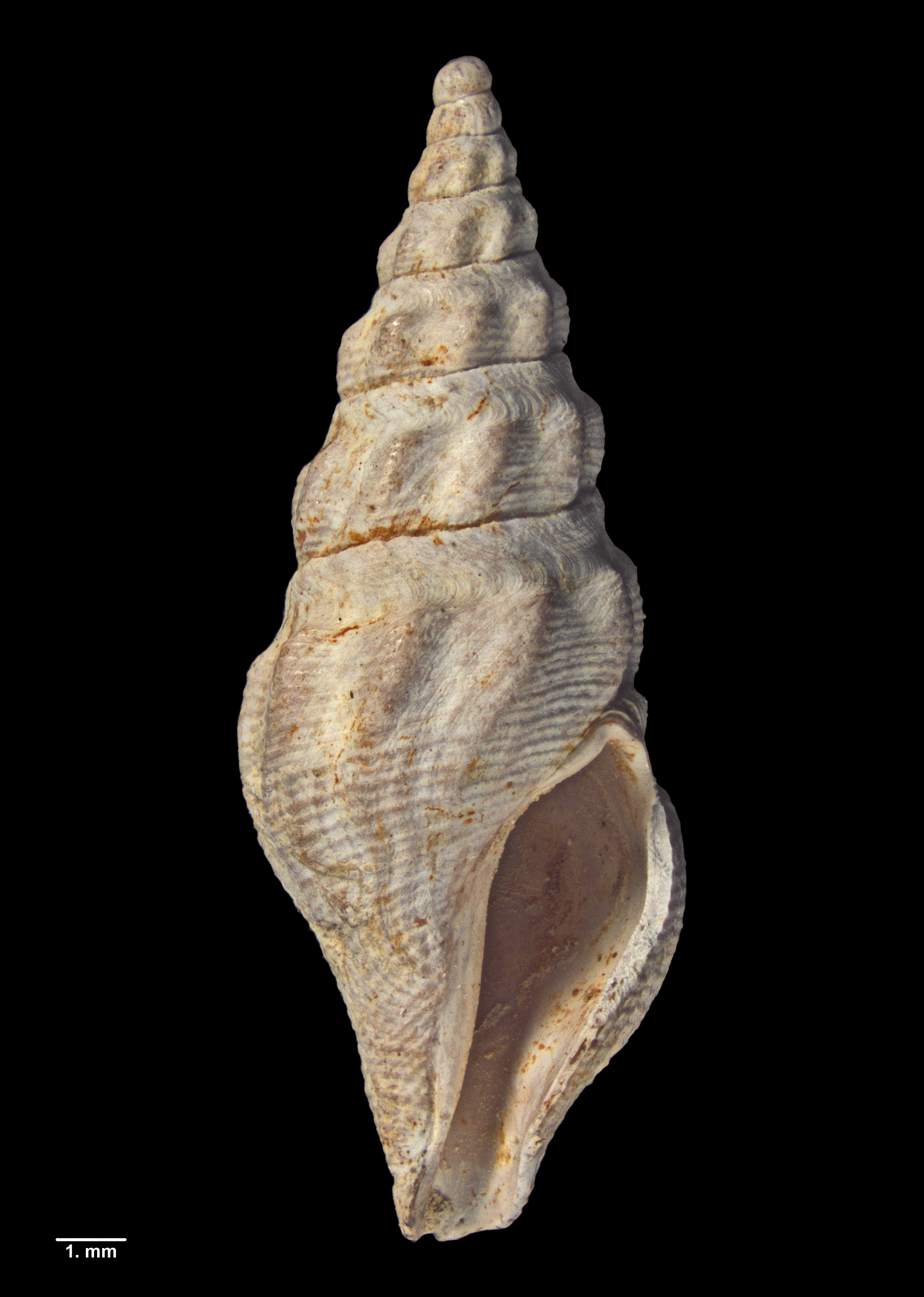
- Holotype from Auckland War Memorial Museum

Scientific classification
- Kingdom: Animalia
- Phylum: Mollusca
- Class: Gastropoda
- Subclass: Caenogastropoda
- Order: Neogastropoda
- Family: Pseudomelatomidae
- Genus: Inquisitor
- Species: †I. delicatulus

Binomial name
- †Inquisitor delicatulus (A. W. B. Powell, 1944)

Synonyms
- Pseudoinquisitor delicatulus A. W. B. Powell, 1944

= Inquisitor delicatulus =

Inquisitor delicatulus Temporal range: late Miocene–early Pliocene

Extinct species of gastropod

Inquisitor delicatulus is an extinct species of sea snail, a marine gastropod mollusc, in the family Pseudomelatomidae. Fossils of the species date to either the late Miocene or early Pliocene strata of the Gippsland Basin of Victoria, Australia.

== Description ==
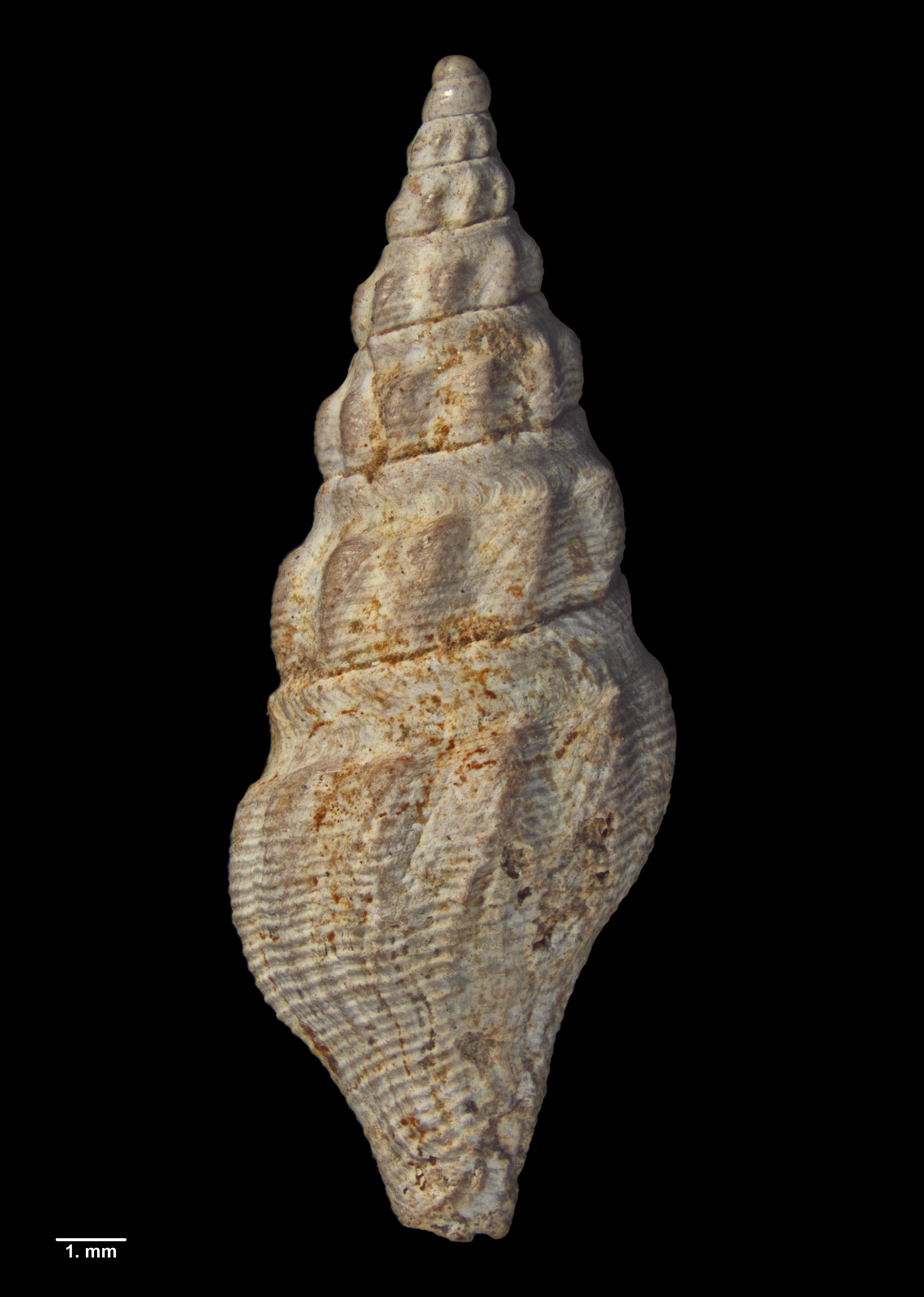
Reverse view of holotype

In the original description, Powell described the species as follows:

Differs from [I. gippslandensis, I. oblongulus, I. scabriculus and I. trinervis] in the numerous delicate spirals and obliquely flexuous, more narrowly crested axials. Periphery just above middle of whorl height; axials planed off on top by broadly excavated shoulder, and rapidly fading out over base. Subsutural fold moderately broad, but not heavy. Spirals linear-spaced, 5-9 per whorl, and about 35 on body-whorl and base.

The holotype of the species measures 17.2 mm (0.68 in) in length and has a diameter of 6.5 mm (0.26 in).

== Taxonomy ==
The species was first described by A. W. B. Powell in 1944 as Pseudoinquisitor delicatulus. Powell recombined the species as Inquisitor delicatulus in 1966, a move that malacologist Thomas A. Darragh agreed with in 1970. The holotype was collected from the Gippsland Lakes, Victoria, Australia at an unknown date prior to 1945, and is held by the Auckland War Memorial Museum.

== Distribution ==
This extinct marine species occurs in strata of the Gippsland Basin of Victoria, Australia, including the Jemmys Point Formation, and likely dates to the late Miocene or early Pliocene.
