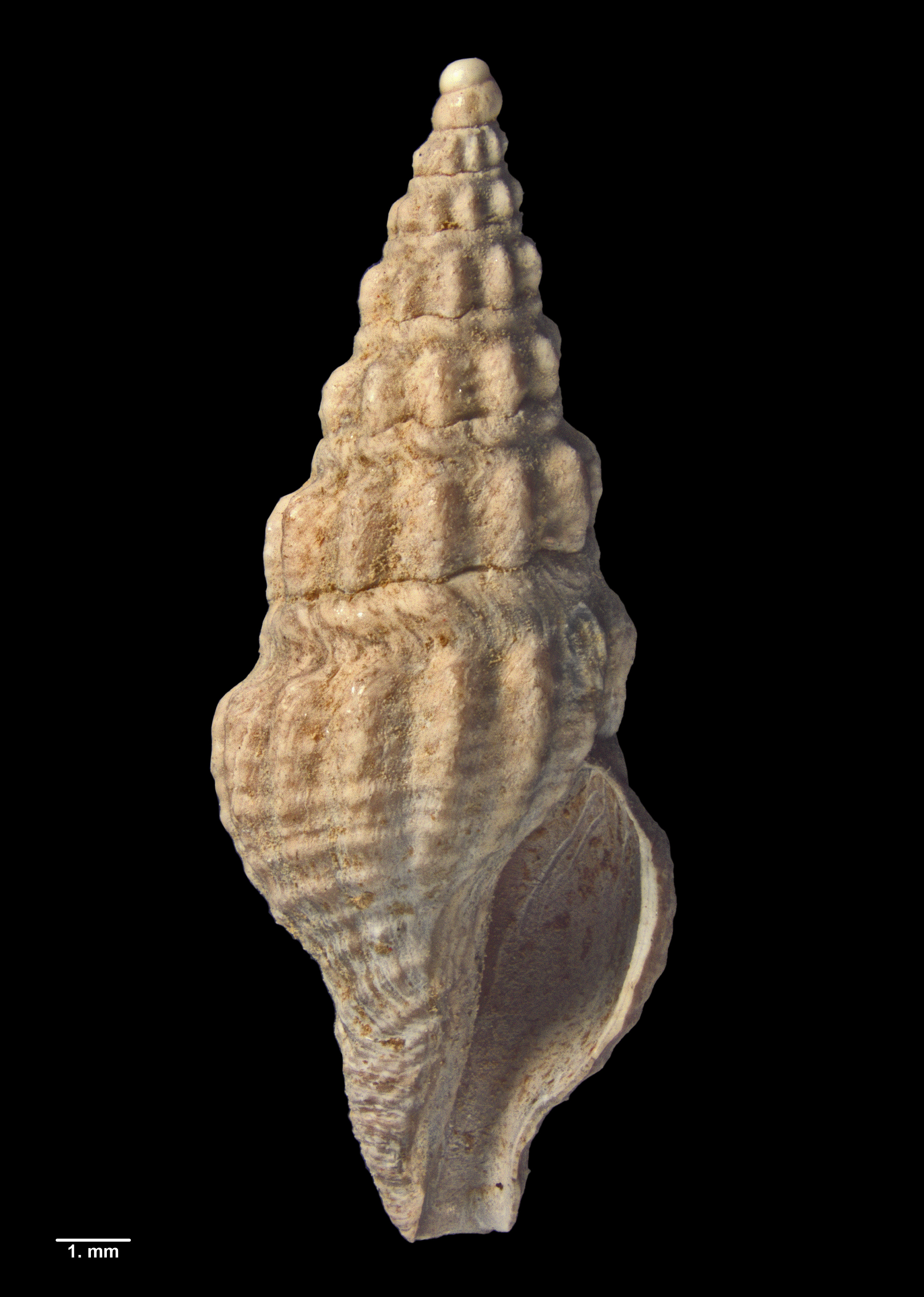
- Holotype from Auckland War Memorial Museum

Scientific classification
- Kingdom: Animalia
- Phylum: Mollusca
- Class: Gastropoda
- Subclass: Caenogastropoda
- Order: Neogastropoda
- Family: Pseudomelatomidae
- Genus: Inquisitor
- Species: †I. gippslandensis

Binomial name
- †Inquisitor gippslandensis (A. W. B. Powell, 1944)

Synonyms
- Pseudoinquisitor gippslandensis A. W. B. Powell, 1944

= Inquisitor gippslandensis =

Inquisitor gippslandensis Temporal range: late Miocene–early Pliocene

Extinct species of gastropod

Inquisitor gippslandensis is an extinct species of sea snail, a marine gastropod mollusc, in the family Pseudomelatomidae. Fossils of the species date to either the late Miocene or early Pliocene strata of the Gippsland Basin of Victoria, Australia.

== Description ==
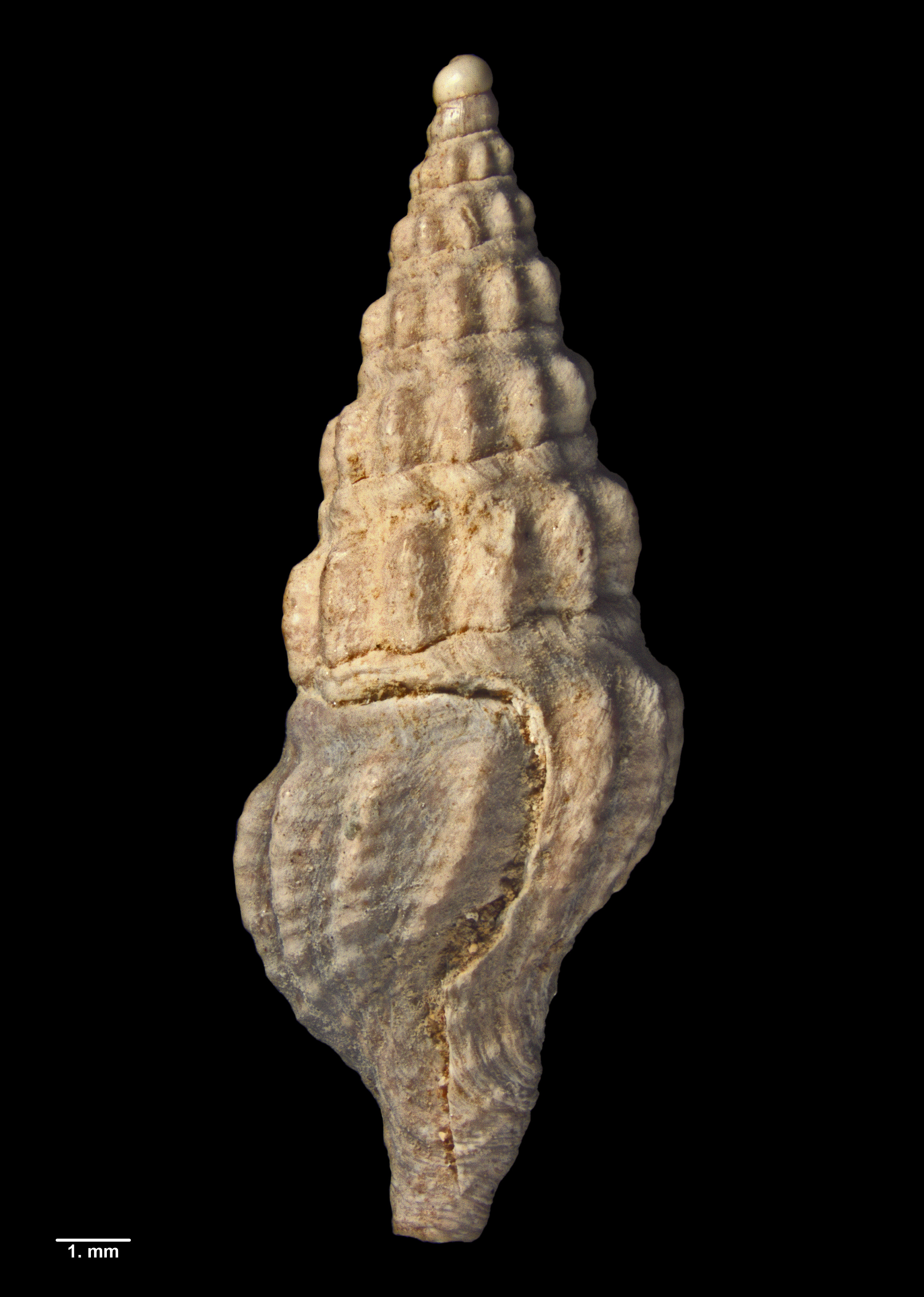
Reverse view of holotype

In the original description, Powell described the species as follows:

Species similar to trinervis, but proportionately broader, with slightly telescoped spire-whorls, more spirals, and a stronger, more persistent subsutural fold. Axials broadly rounded, vertical, 13 per whorl, extending over base. Spiral cords strong, 3- 5 on spire-whorls, 16 on body-whorl and base. Subsutural fold strong, shoulder deeply concave. Periphery at two-thirds whorl height.

The holotype of the species measures 16 mm (0.63 in) in length and has a diameter of 6.25 mm (0.246 in).

== Taxonomy ==
The species was first described by A. W. B. Powell in 1944 as Pseudoinquisitor gippslandensis. Powell recombined the species as Inquisitor gippslandensis in 1966, a move that malacologist Thomas A. Darragh agreed with in 1970. The holotype was collected from the Gippsland Lakes, Victoria, Australia at an unknown date prior to 1945, and is held by the Auckland War Memorial Museum.

== Distribution ==
This extinct marine species occurs in strata of the Gippsland Basin of Victoria, Australia, including the Jemmys Point Formation, and likely dates to the late Miocene or early Pliocene.
