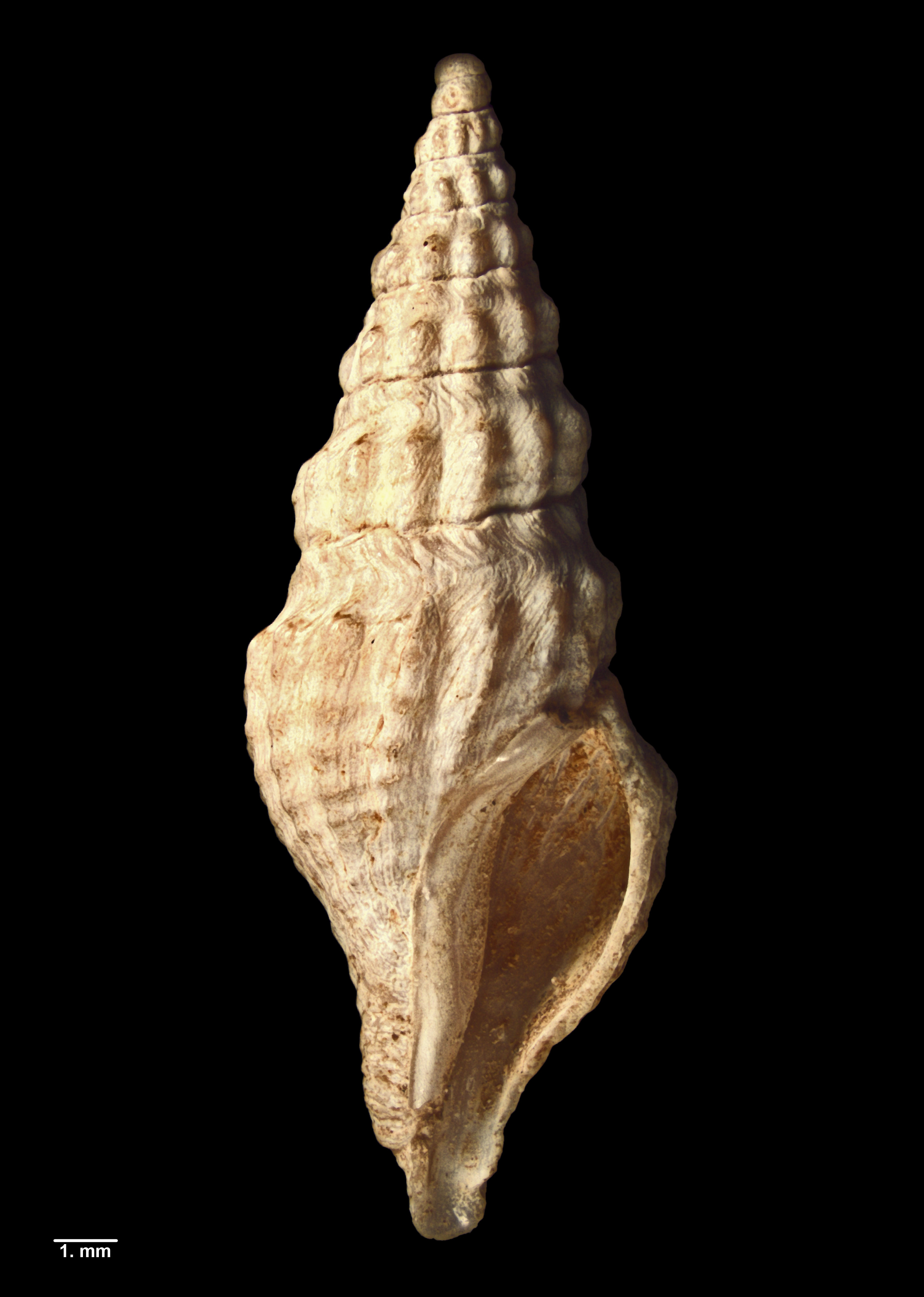
- Holotype from Auckland War Memorial Museum

Scientific classification
- Kingdom: Animalia
- Phylum: Mollusca
- Class: Gastropoda
- Subclass: Caenogastropoda
- Order: Neogastropoda
- Family: Pseudomelatomidae
- Genus: Inquisitor
- Species: †I. trinervis

Binomial name
- †Inquisitor trinervis (A. W. B. Powell, 1944)

Synonyms
- Pseudoinquisitor trinervis A. W. B. Powell, 1944

= Inquisitor trinervis =

Inquisitor trinervis Temporal range: early Pliocene

Extinct species of gastropod

Inquisitor trinervis is an extinct species of sea snail, a marine gastropod mollusc, in the family Pseudomelatomidae. Fossils of the species date to early Pliocene strata of the Gippsland Basin of Victoria, Australia.

== Description ==
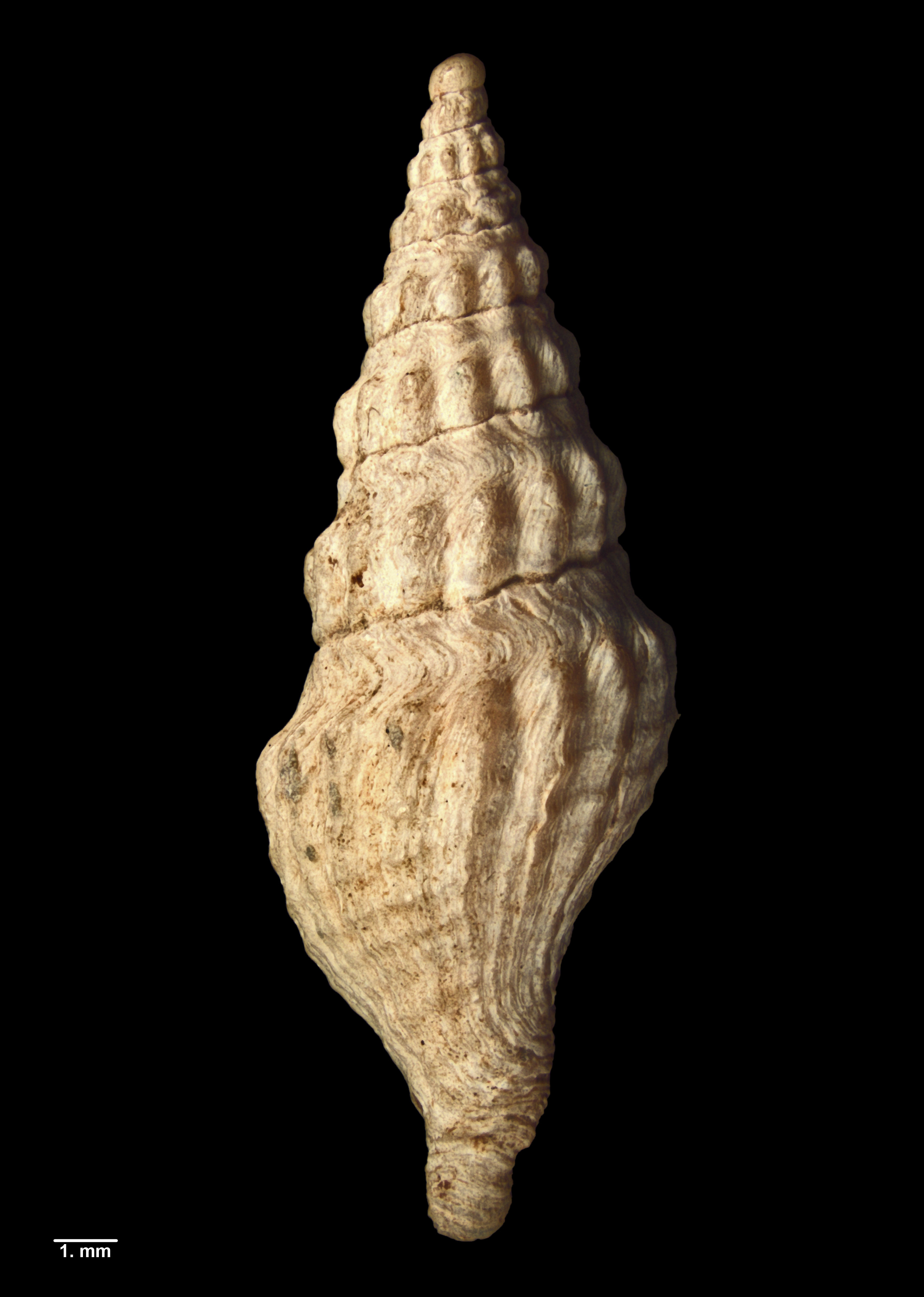
Reverse view of holotype

In the original description, Powell described the species as follows:

Shell robust, strongly axially and spirally sculptured. Axials broadly rounded, vertical, 14-15 per whorl, extending from peripheral angle to half way across base. Spiral cords moderately strong, 3 on spire-whorls, from periphery to lower suture, and 13 on body-whorl and base. Subsutural fold distinct over early spire-whorls, but later becoming obsolete. Shoulder deeply concave. Periphery just above middle.

The holotype of the species measures 19.5 mm (0.77 in) in length and has a diameter of 7 mm (0.28 in).

== Taxonomy ==
The species was first described by A. W. B. Powell in 1944 as Pseudoinquisitor trinervis. Powell recombined the species as Inquisitor trinervis in 1966, a move that malacologist Thomas A. Darragh agreed with in 1970. The holotype was collected from the Gippsland Lakes, Victoria, Australia at an unknown date prior to 1937 as a part of the Finlay Collection, and is held by the Auckland War Memorial Museum.

== Distribution ==
This extinct marine species occurs in early Pliocene strata of the Gippsland Basin of Victoria, Australia, including the Jemmys Point Formation.
