= 2016 in paleomalacology =

This list, 2016 in molluscan paleontology, is a list of new taxa of ammonites and other fossil cephalopods, as well as fossil gastropods, bivalves and other molluscs that have been described during the year 2016.

== Ammonites ==
=== Research ===
- A study on the phylogenetic relationships of the Middle Jurassic ammonites from India is published by Dutta & Bardhan (2016), who name a new perisphinctid subfamily Sivajiceratinae.
- Ammonite embryonic shell clusters preserved within the body chambers of mature macroconch shells of the Early Cretaceous (Aptian) ammonite Sinzovia sazonovae are described by Mironenko & Rogov (2016), who interpret the finding as indicative of ovoviviparity in at least some ammonites.

=== New taxa ===
Name	Novelty	Status	Authors	Age	Unit	Location	Notes	Images
Acuariceras acucostis	Sp. nov	Valid	Bert & Courville	Late Jurassic (early Oxfordian)		France		
Albanites vulgaris	Sp. nov	Valid	Zakharov & Smyshlyaeva	Early Triassic (Olenekian)		Russia (Primorsky Krai)		
Amoebites peregrinator	Sp. nov	Valid	Rogov	Late Jurassic (Kimmeridgian)		Russia		
Amoeboceras (?) klimovae	Sp. nov	Valid	Rogov	Late Jurassic (Kimmeridgian)		Russia		
Arnioceras? viligaense	Sp. nov	Valid	Repin	Early Jurassic		Russia		
Aulatornoceras schurbuschensis	Sp. nov	Valid	Becker in Becker et al.	Devonian (Famennian)	Nehden Formation	Germany		
Bajarunia magna	Sp. nov	Valid	Zakharov & Smyshlyaeva	Early Triassic (Olenekian)		Russia (Primorsky Krai)		
Barguesiella	Gen. et 2 sp. nov	Valid	Frau et al.	Early Cretaceous (Barremian)		France; Italy	A member of Ancylocerataceae belonging to the family Heteroceratidae. The type species is B. goudesense; genus also includes B. mantei.	
Berriasella (Berriasella) multicostata	Sp. nov	Valid	Hoedemaeker in Hoedemaeker et al.	Early Cretaceous		Bulgaria; France; Tunisia	A member of Neocomitidae.	
Berriasella (Hegaratella) kleini	Sp. nov	Valid	Hoedemaeker in Hoedemaeker et al.	Early Cretaceous (Berriasian)		Spain; France?	A member of Neocomitidae.	
Berriasella (Hegaratella) taverai	Sp. nov	Valid	Hoedemaeker in Hoedemaeker et al.	Early Cretaceous (Berriasian)		Crimean Peninsula; France; Spain	A member of Neocomitidae.	
Berriasella (Hegaratella) vasiceki	Sp. nov	Valid	Hoedemaeker in Hoedemaeker et al.	Early Cretaceous (Berriasian)		France; Spain	A member of Neocomitidae.	
Beyrichoceras jadarense	Sp. nov	Valid	Korn & Sudar	Carboniferous (Viséan)		Serbia	A member of Maxigoniatitidae, a species of Beyrichoceras.	
Bochianites aculeatus	Sp. nov	Valid	Hoedemaeker in Hoedemaeker et al.	Early Cretaceous (Berriasian)		France; Spain	A member of Bochianitidae.	
Cadoceras bellabimba	Sp. nov	Valid	Mita	Middle Jurassic (Callovian)		Russia		
Calanquites	Gen. et comb. nov	Valid	Frau et al.	Early Cretaceous (Barremian-Aptian)		France; Georgia	A member of Ancylocerataceae belonging to the family Heteroceratidae. The type species is "Imerites" katsharavai Rouchadzé (1933); genus also includes "Imerites" microcostatus Rouchadzé (1933) and "Imerites" semituberculatus Rouchadzé (1933).	
Chapericeras bonti	Sp. nov	Valid	Hoedemaeker in Hoedemaeker et al.	Early Cretaceous (Berriasian)		Spain	A member of Neocomitidae.	
Choicensisphinctes aconcaguensis	Sp. nov	Valid	Vennari	Late Jurassic (Tithonian)	Vaca Muerta Formation	Argentina	A member of the family Ataxioceratidae.	
Colombiceras korotkovi	Sp. nov	Valid	Bogdanova & Mikhailova	Early Cretaceous (Aptian)		Russia (Dagestan; Stavropol Krai)	A member of Acanthohoplitidae.	
Delphinella (Delphinella) angustiumbilicata	Sp. nov	Valid	Hoedemaeker in Hoedemaeker et al.	Early Cretaceous		France	A member of Neocomitidae.	
Delphinella (Delphinella) miravetensis	Sp. nov	Valid	Hoedemaeker in Hoedemaeker et al.	Early Cretaceous (Berriasian)		Spain	A member of Neocomitidae.	
Delphinella (Subdelphinella)	Subgen. nov	Valid	Hoedemaeker in Hoedemaeker et al.	Early Cretaceous		Bulgaria; France	A member of Neocomitidae; a subgenus of Delphinella. The type species is Delphinella ellenica Nikolov (1960); the subgenus also includes D. sevenieri Le Hégarat (1973), D. auzonensis Le Hégarat (1973) D. boisseti Le Hégarat (1973) and D. berthei (Toucas, 1890, sensu Le Hégarat, 1973).	
Didymoceras hidakense	Sp. nov	Valid	Shigeta in Shigeta et al.	Late Cretaceous (Campanian)	Chinomigawa Formation	Japan		
Discoclymenia atlantea	Sp. nov	Valid	Korn, Bockwinkel & Ebbighausen	Devonian (Famennian)		Morocco	A member of Posttornoceratidae.	
Discoclymenia orientalis	Sp. nov	Valid	Korn, Bartzsch & Weyer	Devonian (Famennian)		Russia	A member of Posttornoceratidae.	
Discoclymenia pola	Sp. nov	Valid	Korn, Bockwinkel & Ebbighausen	Devonian (Famennian)		Morocco	A member of Posttornoceratidae.	
Druzeticia	Gen. et sp. nov	Valid	Korn & Sudar	Carboniferous (Viséan)		Serbia	A goniatite of uncertain phylogenetic placement. The type species is Druzeticia decens.	
Ebbighausenites	Gen. et comb. nov	Valid	Korn, Bartzsch & Weyer	Devonian (Famennian)		Germany; Morocco; United Kingdom	A member of Posttornoceratidae. The type species is "Posttornoceras" weyeri Korn (1999); genus also includes "Goniatites" contiguus Münster (1832) and "Wedekindoceras" seidlitzi Schindewolf (1924).	
Emileites callomoni	Sp. nov	Valid	Yin & Chandler	Middle Jurassic		China	A member of Otoitidae, a species of Emileites.	
Entogonites bucheri	Sp. nov	Valid	Klug, De Baets & Korn	Carboniferous (Viséan)		Morocco	A member of Entogonitidae, a species of Entogonites.	
Entogonites serbicus	Sp. nov	Valid	Korn & Sudar	Carboniferous (Viséan)		Serbia	A member of Entogonitidae, a species of Entogonites.	
Eoshumardites popowi	Sp. nov	Valid	Kutygin in Kutygin, Ganelin & Biakov	Late Carboniferous		Russia		
Foellmiceras anglesensis	Sp. nov	Valid	Vermeulen et al.	Early Cretaceous (Barremian)		France	A member of the family Silesitidae.	
Foellmiceras leroyae	Sp. nov	Valid	Vermeulen et al.	Early Cretaceous (Barremian)		France	A member of the family Silesitidae.	
Foellmiceras lukenederi	Sp. nov	Valid	Vermeulen et al.	Early Cretaceous (Barremian)		France	A member of the family Silesitidae.	
Foellmiceras mermini	Sp. nov	Valid	Vermeulen et al.	Early Cretaceous (Barremian)		France	A member of the family Silesitidae.	
Gaudryceras brandyense	Sp. nov	Valid	Raffi & Olivero	Late Cretaceous (Campanian)	Santa Marta Formation	Antarctica		
Gaudryceras rabotense	Sp. nov	Valid	Raffi & Olivero	Late Cretaceous (Campanian)	Rabot Formation; Snow Hill Island Formation	Antarctica		
Gaudryceras santamartense	Sp. nov	Valid	Raffi & Olivero	Late Cretaceous (Santonian-early Campanian)	Santa Marta Formation	Antarctica		
Giovaraites	Gen. et sp. nov	Valid	Frau et al.	Early Cretaceous (Barremian)		France	A member of Ancylocerataceae belonging to the family Heteroceratidae. The type species is G. massiliae.	
Gundolficeras reisdorfi	Sp. nov	Valid	Korn, Bockwinkel & Ebbighausen	Devonian (Famennian)		Morocco		
Gundolficeras rhombiforme	Sp. nov	Valid	Korn, Bockwinkel & Ebbighausen	Devonian (Famennian)		Morocco		
Gundolficeras vescum	Sp. nov	Valid	Korn, Bockwinkel & Ebbighausen	Devonian (Famennian)		Morocco		
Heteroceras denizoti	Sp. nov	Valid	Frau et al.	Early Cretaceous (Barremian)		France	A member of Ancylocerataceae belonging to the family Heteroceratidae.	
Heteroceras veratiae	Sp. nov	Valid	Frau et al.	Early Cretaceous (Barremian)		France	A member of Ancylocerataceae belonging to the family Heteroceratidae.	
Hoploscaphites youngi	Sp. nov	Valid	Larson	Late Cretaceous (late Campanian)	Coon Creek Formation	United States (Tennessee)		
Immenites	Gen. et comb. nov	Valid	Becker in Becker et al.	Devonian (Famennian)	Nehden Formation	Germany	A new genus for "Truyolsoceras" retro Becker (1993).	
Indansites	Gen. et comb. nov	Valid	Vennari	Late Jurassic (Tithonian)	Vaca Muerta Formation	Argentina	A member of the family Ataxioceratidae. Genus includes I. malarguensis (Spath, 1925).	
Inyoceras singularis	Sp. nov	Valid	Zakharov & Smyshlyaeva	Early Triassic (Olenekian)		Russia (Primorsky Krai)		
Ivaldiceras	Gen. et 2 sp. nov	Valid	Delanoy et al.	Early Cretaceous (early Aptian)		France	A possible member of the superfamily Ptychoceratoidea and the family Macroscaphitidae. The type species is I. baratteroi; genus also includes I. divajeuensis.	
Kamenushkaites	Gen. et sp. nov	Valid	Zakharov & Smyshlyaeva	Early Triassic (Olenekian)		Russia (Primorsky Krai)	Genus includes new species Kamenushkaites acutus.	
Koninckitoides solus	Sp. nov	Valid	Zakharov & Smyshlyaeva	Early Triassic (Olenekian)		Russia (Primorsky Krai)		
Lamites	Gen. et sp. nov	Valid	Repin	Early Jurassic		Russia	A member of Schlotheimiidae. The type species is L. ochoticus.	
Leiophyllites wakoi	Sp. nov	Disputed	Ehiro, Sasaki & Kano	Early Triassic (late Olenekian)	Osawa Formation	Japan	Considered to be a junior synonym of Albanites sheldoni by Shigeta, Endo & Inose (2024).	
Lopeziceras	Gen. et comb. nov	Valid	Frau et al.	Early Cretaceous (Berriasian)		Bulgaria; France; Hungary; Poland; Spain	A member of Perisphinctoidea belonging to the family Himalayitidae. The type species is "Ammonites" chaperi Pictet (1868); genus also includes "Dalmasiceras" aristidis Mazenot (1939).	
Lytoceras subfimbriatoides	Sp. nov	Valid	Hoedemaeker in Hoedemaeker et al.	Early Cretaceous (Berriasian)		Bulgaria; France; Romania; Spain	A member of Lytoceratidae.	
Mangoldiceras	Gen. et sp. nov	Valid	Yin & Chandler	Middle Jurassic (late Bathonian)		Italy	A member of Morphoceratidae. The type species is Mangoldiceras distefanoi.	
Metagarantiana	Gen. et comb. et 2 sp. nov	Valid	Fernández-López & Pavia	Middle Jurassic (Bajocian)		France	A member of Garantianinae. Genus includes "Garantiana" tetragona occidentalis Gauthier (2003) (raised to the rank of a distinct species M. occidentalis), as well as new species M. media and M. magna.	
Microderoceras nautilum	Sp. nov	Valid	Edmunds et al.	Early Jurassic (Sinemurian)		United Kingdom	An eoderoceratid ammonite, a species of Microderoceras.	
Nodososilesites	Gen. et 3 sp. et comb. nov	Valid	Vermeulen et al.	Early Cretaceous (Barremian)		France; Germany; Italy	A member of the family Silesitidae. The type species is N. silvestreae; genus also includes new species N. celestinae and N. allardae, as well as "Neoastieria" houilloni Vermeulen et al. (2015).	
Nordophiceratoides praecox	Sp. nov	Valid	Zakharov & Smyshlyaeva	Early Triassic (Olenekian)		Russia (Primorsky Krai)		
Palaeophyllites admirandus	Sp. nov	Valid	Zakharov & Smyshlyaeva	Early Triassic (Olenekian)		Russia (Primorsky Krai)		
Paragarantiana sullyensis	Sp. nov	Valid	Fernández-López & Pavia	Middle Jurassic (Bajocian)		France	A member of Garantianinae.	
Platyclymenia (Platyclymenia) levata	Sp. nov	Valid	Hartenfels & Becker	Late Devonian		Morocco		
Platysilesites	Gen. et 2 sp. et comb. nov	Valid	Vermeulen et al.	Early Cretaceous (Barremian)		France; Ukraine	A member of the family Silesitidae. The type species is P. duvali; genus also includes new species P. thomasi, as well as "Silesites" tenuis Karakasch (1907).	
Posttornoceras ascendens	Sp. nov	Valid	Hartenfels & Becker	Late Devonian		Morocco		
Posttornoceras elegantum	Sp. nov	Valid	Korn, Bockwinkel & Ebbighausen	Devonian (Famennian)		Morocco	A member of Posttornoceratidae.	
Posttornoceras janae	Sp. nov	Valid	Korn, Bockwinkel & Ebbighausen	Devonian (Famennian)		Morocco	A member of Posttornoceratidae.	
Posttornoceras ouaoufilalense	Sp. nov	Valid	Korn, Bockwinkel & Ebbighausen	Devonian (Famennian)		Morocco	A member of Posttornoceratidae.	
Praedalmasiceras	Gen. et comb. nov	Valid	Frau et al.	Early Cretaceous (Berriasian)		France; Spain	A member of Perisphinctoidea belonging to the family Himalayitidae. The type species is "Hoplites (Dalmasiceras)" spiticeroides Djanélidzé (1922); genus also includes "Hoplites (Dalmasiceras)" subspiticeroides Djanélidzé (1922), "Hoplites (Dalmasiceras)" dalmasi var. nana Djanélidzé (1922), "Ammonites" progenitor Oppel (1865), "Hoplites (Dalmasiceras)" subprogenitor Jacob (in coll.) in Djanélidzé (1922), "Hoplites (Dalmasiceras)" dalmasi var. gigas Djanélidzé (1922), "Dalmasiceras" toucasi Mazenot (1939), "Dalmasiceras" subloevis Mazenot (1939), "Dalmasiceras" subloevis var. praecox Jacob (in coll.) in Mazenot (1939), "Dalmasiceras" djanelidzei Mazenot (1939), "Dalmasiceras" djanelidzei var. gigas Mazenot (1939), "Dalmasiceras" biplanum Mazenot (1939), "Dalmasiceras" pseudoprogenitor Nikolov (1982), "Hoplites" botellae Kilian (1889), "Hoplites (Dalmasiceras)" kiliani Djanélidzé (1922), "Dalmasiceras" gevreyi Mazenot (1939) and "Dalmasiceras" sayniforme Tavera (1985).	
Prolecanites stevanovici	Sp. nov	Valid	Korn & Sudar	Carboniferous (Viséan)		Serbia	A member of Prolecanitaceae belonging to the family Prolecanitidae, a species of Prolecanites.	
Promicroceras (Leptomicroceras) cowapi	Subgen. et sp. nov	Valid	Edmunds et al.	Early Jurassic (Sinemurian)		United Kingdom	An eoderoceratid ammonite, a subgenus and species of Promicroceras.	
Protetragonites zuegeli	Sp. nov	Valid	Maisch & Salfinger-Maisch	Late Jurassic (late Oxfordian)	Impressamergel Formation	Germany		
Pseudinvoluticeras primordialis	Sp. nov	Valid	Vennari	Late Jurassic (Tithonian)	Vaca Muerta Formation	Argentina	A member of the family Ataxioceratidae.	
Pseudokymatites tabulatus	Sp. nov	Disputed	Ehiro, Sasaki & Kano	Early Triassic (late Olenekian)	Osawa Formation	Japan	Considered to be a junior synonym of Stacheites floweri by Shigeta, Endo & Inose (2024).	
Pseudosubplanites hegarati	Sp. nov	Valid	Hoedemaeker in Hoedemaeker et al.	Early Cretaceous (Berriasian)		Spain	A member of Ataxioceratidae.	
Pseudosubplanites paracombesi	Sp. nov	Valid	Hoedemaeker in Hoedemaeker et al.	Early Cretaceous (Berriasian)		Bulgaria; France; Spain	A member of Ataxioceratidae.	
Pseudosubplanites tolloensis	Sp. nov	Valid	Hoedemaeker in Hoedemaeker et al.	Early Cretaceous (Berriasian)		Bulgaria; France; Spain	A member of Ataxioceratidae.	
Pseudoteloceras	Gen. et 3 sp. et comb. nov	Valid	Pavia & Fernandez-Lopez	Middle Jurassic (early Bajocian)		France	A member of Stephanoceratidae. The type species is Pseudoteloceras crosillense; genus also includes new species Pseudoteloceras maerteni and Pseudoteloceras boursicoti, as well as Pseudoteloceras geometricum (Maubeuge).	
Salinites finicostatum	Sp. nov	Valid	Zell & Stinnesbeck	Late Jurassic (latest Tithonian)	La Caja Formation	Cuba; Mexico	A member of Haploceratidae.	
Shimanskyites	Gen. et sp. nov	Valid	Zakharov & Smyshlyaeva in Zakharov et al.	Early Triassic (Olenekian)		Russia	A member of the family Xenoceltitidae. The type species is S. shimanskyi.	
Silesites aequicostatum	Sp. nov	Valid	Vermeulen et al.	Early Cretaceous (Barremian)		France		
Silesites intermedius	Sp. nov	Valid	Vermeulen et al.	Early Cretaceous (Barremian)		France		
Silesites izardi	Sp. nov	Valid	Vermeulen et al.	Early Cretaceous (Barremian)		France		
Silesites lamauryae	Sp. nov	Valid	Vermeulen et al.	Early Cretaceous (Barremian)		France		
Silesites pachycostatum	Sp. nov	Valid	Vermeulen et al.	Early Cretaceous (Barremian)		France		
Stenoclymenia rectangula	Sp. nov	Valid	Hartenfels & Becker	Late Devonian		Morocco		
Substeueroceras broyonense	Sp. nov	Valid	Hoedemaeker in Hoedemaeker et al.	Early Cretaceous (Berriasian)		France; Spain	A member of Neocomitidae.	
'Subthurmannia' pseudocarpathica	Sp. nov	Valid	Hoedemaeker in Hoedemaeker et al.	Early Cretaceous (Berriasian)		Bulgaria; France; Spain	A member of Neocomitidae.	
Tirnovella bogdanovae	Sp. nov	Valid	Hoedemaeker in Hoedemaeker et al.	Early Cretaceous (Berriasian)		Bulgaria; France; Spain	A member of Neocomitidae.	
Tirnovella companyi	Sp. nov	Valid	Hoedemaeker in Hoedemaeker et al.	Early Cretaceous (Berriasian)		Bulgaria; Crimean Peninsula; France; Spain	A member of Neocomitidae.	
Tirolites opiparus	Sp. nov	Valid	Zakharov & Smyshlyaeva	Early Triassic (Olenekian)		Russia (Primorsky Krai)		
Tokurites	Gen. et sp. nov	Valid	Repin	Early Jurassic		Russia	A member of Dactylioceratidae. The type species is T. inopinatus.	
Turomtchites	Gen. et sp. nov	Valid	Repin	Early Jurassic		Russia	A member of Phyllocerataceae. The type species is T. rarus.	
Ubites divnae	Sp. nov	Valid	Korn & Sudar	Carboniferous (Viséan)		Serbia	A member of Entogonitidae, a species of Ubites.	
Ubites novaki	Sp. nov	Valid	Korn & Sudar	Carboniferous (Viséan)		Serbia	A member of Entogonitidae, a species of Ubites.	
Virgatopavlovia dembowskae	Sp. nov	Valid	Matyja & Wierzbowski	Late Jurassic (Tithonian)	Kcynia Formation	Poland	A member of the family Dorsoplanitidae belonging to the subfamily Pavloviinae.	
Virgatopavlovia janeki	Sp. nov	Valid	Matyja & Wierzbowski	Late Jurassic (Tithonian)	Kcynia Formation; Pałuki Formation	Poland	A member of the family Dorsoplanitidae belonging to the subfamily Pavloviinae.	
Yvesgalleticeras proximus	Sp. nov	Valid	Zakharov & Smyshlyaeva	Early Triassic (Olenekian)		Russia (Primorsky Krai)		
Zaraiskites lewinskii	Sp. nov	Valid	Matyja & Wierzbowski	Late Jurassic (Tithonian)	Kcynia Formation	Poland		

== Other cephalopods ==
=== Research ===
- Exceptionally preserved specimens of Acanthoteuthis speciosa, providing new information on the anatomy of members of the species, are described from the Upper Jurassic of Solnhofen (Germany) by Klug et al. (2016).
- A description of the external characters and internal structures of a well-preserved specimen of Proteroctopus ribeti from the Middle Jurassic (Callovian) Lagerstätte of La-Voulte-sur-Rhône (France) and a study on the phylogenetic relationships of the species is published by Kruta et al. (2016).

=== New taxa ===
Name	Novelty	Status	Authors	Age	Unit	Location	Notes	Images
Bandoceras	Gen. et sp. nov	Valid	Niko	Late Silurian	Hitoegane Formation	Japan	A member of Orthocerida. Genus includes new species B. gifuense.	
Domatoceras collinsvillense	Sp. nov	Valid	Niko & Mapes	Late Carboniferous (latest Desmoinesian)	Lost Branch Formation	United States (Oklahoma)		
Epistroboceras mangeri	Sp. nov	Valid	Niko & Mapes	Early Carboniferous (middle Chesterian)	Fayetteville Formation	United States (Arkansas)	A member of Trigonoceratidae, a species of Epistroboceras.	
Heminautilus ? japonicus	Sp. nov	Valid	Baudouin et al.	Early Cretaceous (late Barremian)		Japan	A nautiloid, possibly a species of Heminautilus.	
Indonautilus innocens	Sp. nov	Valid	Pérez-Valera et al.	Middle Triassic (Ladinian)		Spain		
Loligo clarkei	Sp. nov	Valid	Neige, Lapierre & Merle	Eocene (Lutetian)		France; United States (Virginia)	A pencil squid, a species of Loligo	
Marekites nebrodensis	Sp. nov	Valid	Fuchs et al.	Late Cretaceous (late Cenomanian)		Italy	A coleoid belonging to the family Palaeololiginidae.	
Pseudoteudopsis	Gen. et sp. nov	Valid	Riccardi	Middle Jurassic (Callovian)		Chile	A squid. Genus includes new species P. perezi.	
Sepia boletzkyi	Sp. nov	Valid	Neige, Lapierre & Merle	Eocene (middle Lutetian)		France	A cuttlefish, a species of Sepia	
Sepia juliebarborarum	Sp. nov	Valid	Košt'ák et al.	Miocene (late Badenian)		Slovakia	A cuttlefish, a species of Sepia.	
Sepia mikuzi	Sp. nov	Valid	Košt'ák et al.	Miocene (middle Badenian)		Slovenia	A cuttlefish, a species of Sepia.	
?Sepia pira	Sp. nov	Valid	Neige, Lapierre & Merle	Eocene (middle Lutetian)		France	A cuttlefish, possibly a species of Sepia	
Trachyteuthis chilensis	Sp. nov	Valid	Riccardi	Late Jurassic (Oxfordian)		Chile	A squid.	
Trematoceras hikichii	Sp. nov	Valid	Niko, Ehiro & Takaizumi	Early Triassic	Osawa Formation	Japan		
Valhallites tuberculatus	Sp. nov	Valid	Niko & Mapes	Early Carboniferous (middle Chesterian)	Fayetteville Formation	United States (Arkansas)	A member of Koninckioceratidae, a species of Valhallites.	
Valhallites westforkensis	Sp. nov	Valid	Niko & Mapes	Early Carboniferous (middle Chesterian)	Fayetteville Formation	United States (Arkansas)	A member of Koninckioceratidae, a species of Valhallites.	

== Gastropods ==
=== Research ===
- An unnamed species of Heliconoides is described by Janssen & Goedert (2016) based on a single specimen from the Late Cretaceous (Campanian) of the San Juan Islands (Washington, United States).

=== New taxa ===
Name	Novelty	Status	Authors	Age	Unit	Location	Notes	Images
Aclis pacaudi	Sp. nov	Valid	Van Dingenen, Ceulemans & Landau	Pliocene (Zanclean)		France	A species of Aclis.	
Acmaturris echinata	Sp. nov	Valid	Landau, da Silva & Heitz	Miocene	Cantaure Formation	Venezuela	A member of Mangeliidae.	
Admete katsuhiraensis	Sp. nov	Valid	Amano, Oleinik & Jenkins	Paleocene	Katsuhira Formation	Japan	A species of Admete.	
Aesopus faberi	Sp. nov	Valid	Landau, da Silva & Heitz	Miocene	Cantaure Formation	Venezuela	A species of Aesopus.	
Agalactochilus	Gen. et comb. nov	Valid	Kadolsky, Binder & Neubauer	Miocene		Austria; Germany; Poland; Hungary?	A new genus for "Helix" leobersdorfensis Troll (1907); genus also includes "Helix" inflexa Zieten (1832), "Helix" mattiaca Steininger (1835), "Helix (Galactochilus)" silesiaca Andreae (1902) and possibly "Galactochilus" sarmaticum Gaál (1910).	
Agathistoma paraguanensis	Sp. nov	Valid	Landau, da Silva & Heitz	Miocene	Cantaure Formation	Venezuela	A member of Tegulidae.	
Agladrillia falconensis	Sp. nov	Valid	Landau, da Silva & Heitz	Miocene	Cantaure Formation	Venezuela	A species of Agladrillia.	
Agladrillia labiospinosa	Sp. nov	Valid	Landau, da Silva & Heitz	Miocene	Cantaure Formation	Venezuela	A species of Agladrillia.	
Alcithoe wangaloaensis	Sp. nov	Valid	Stilwell	Paleocene	Wangaloa Formation	New Zealand	A volute; a species of Alcithoe sensu lato.	
Alvania calasi	Sp. nov	Valid	Van Dingenen, Ceulemans & Landau	Pliocene (Zanclean)		France	A species of Alvania.	
Alvania dissensia	Sp. nov	Valid	Van Dingenen, Ceulemans & Landau	Pliocene (Zanclean)		France	A species of Alvania.	
Alvania goolaertsi	Sp. nov	Valid	Marquet	Oligocene	Boom Clay Formation	Belgium		
Alvania merlei	Sp. nov	Valid	Van Dingenen, Ceulemans & Landau	Pliocene (Zanclean)		France	A species of Alvania.	
Alvania vanremoorteli	Sp. nov	Valid	Marquet	Oligocene	Boom Clay Formation	Belgium		
Alvania zbyszewskii	Sp. nov	Valid	Van Dingenen, Ceulemans & Landau	Pliocene (Zanclean)		France	A species of Alvania.	
Ampullina pichinka	Sp. nov	Valid	Cataldo & Lazo	Early Cretaceous (Hauterivian)	Agrio Formation	Argentina	A species of Ampullina.	
Ampullonatica pseudorepressa	Sp. nov	Valid	Robba, Pedriali & Quaggiotto	Oligocene (Rupelian)		Italy	A member of Naticidae, a species of Ampullonatica.	
Anchura pelsaerti	Sp. nov	Valid	Wild & Stilwell	Early Cretaceous (Albian)		Batavia Knoll, the western edge of the Perth Abyssal Plain, eastern Indian Ocean	A member of Aporrhaidae.	
Angyomphalus congletonensis	Sp. nov	Valid	Peel	Carboniferous (Namurian)	Morridge Formation	United Kingdom		
Anomphalus lateumbilicatus	Sp. nov	Valid	Nützel & Ketwetsuriya in Ketwetsuriya, Nützel & Kanjanapayont	Permian (Wordian)	Tak Fa Formation	Thailand	A member of Trochoidea belonging to the family Anomphalidae.	
Antillophos elongatus	Sp. nov	Valid	Landau, da Silva & Heitz	Miocene	Cantaure Formation	Venezuela	A species of Antillophos.	
Aplus pseudoassimilis	Sp. nov	Valid	Brunetti & Della Bella	Pliocene		Spain	A member of Buccinidae.	
Arabicolaria	Gen. et comb. et sp. nov	Valid	Harzhauser & Neubauer in Harzhauser et al.	Eocene or Oligocene (Priabonian or early Rupelian)	Zalumah Formation	Oman	A member of Stylommatophora belonging to the family Vidaliellidae. The type species is "Limicolaria" omanensis Neubert & Van Damme (2012); genus also contains new species Arabicolaria arabica and possibly also Achatina sculpturata Neubert & Van Damme (2012).	
Arabiella	Gen. et sp. nov	Valid	Kadolsky, Harzhauser & Neubauer in Harzhauser et al.	Eocene or Oligocene (Priabonian or early Rupelian)	Zalumah Formation	Oman	A member of Truncatelloidea, possibly a member of Hydrobiidae. The type species is Arabiella arabica.	
Archicypraea faullummeli	Sp. nov	Valid	Dolin & Aguerre	Eocene (Ypresian)		France	A member of Cypraeidae, a species of Archicypraea.	
Archicypraea schtrocki	Sp. nov	Valid	Dolin & Aguerre	Eocene (Ypresian)		France	A member of Cypraeidae, a species of Archicypraea.	
Athleta (Volutospina) depulsor	Sp. nov	Valid	Berezovsky in Berezovsky & Girik	Eocene		Ukraine	A species of Athleta.	
Athleta (Volutospina) falarica	Sp. nov	Valid	Berezovsky in Berezovsky & Girik	Eocene		Ukraine	A species of Athleta.	
Atys gravidus	Sp. nov	Valid	Landau, da Silva & Heitz	Miocene	Cantaure Formation	Venezuela	A species of Atys.	
Bathrotomaria iranica	Sp. nov	Valid	Ferrari, Binazadeh & Kaim	Middle Jurassic (Bajocian)	Badamu Formation	Iran	A member of Pleurotomariidae.	
Bathyancistrolepis mikasaensis	Sp. nov	Valid	Amano & Oleinik	Late Eocene	Poronai Formation	Japan	A member of Buccinidae belonging to the subfamily Ancistrolepidinae.	
Baylea praeburtasorum	Sp. nov	Valid	Mazaev	Permian (Kazanian)		Russia		
Baylea shilovskyi	Sp. nov	Valid	Mazaev	Permian (Kazanian)		Russia		
Baylea? umbilicata	Sp. nov	Valid	Nützel & Ketwetsuriya in Ketwetsuriya, Nützel & Kanjanapayont	Permian (Wordian)	Tak Fa Formation	Thailand	A member of the family Raphistomatidae.	
Bela? robusta	Sp. nov	Junior homonym	Scarponi et al.	Miocene (early Serravallian)	Pidhirtsi Beds	Ukraine	A member of Mangeliidae, possibly a species of Bela. The specific name is preoccupied by Bela robusta Packard; Landau et al. (2026) coined a replacement name Bela sossoi.	
Bela varovtsiana	Sp. nov	Valid	Scarponi et al.	Miocene (early Serravallian)	Pidhirtsi Beds	Ukraine	A member of Mangeliidae, a species of Bela.	
Belgrandia zlatae	Sp. nov	Valid	Esu & Girotti	Late Pliocene?-early Pleistocene		Italy	A species of Belgrandia.	
Bernaya marcominii	Sp. nov	Valid	Dolin & Aguerre	Eocene (Ypresian)		France	A Bernaya.	
Bernaya schouveri	Sp. nov	Valid	Dolin & Aguerre	Eocene (Ypresian)		France	A Bernaya.	
Bernaya sixi	Sp. nov	Valid	Pacaud & Robert	Eocene (Ypresian)		France	A species of Bernaya.	
Biomphalaria reversa	Sp. nov	Valid	Cabrera, Martínez & Norbis	Late Cretaceous	Queguay Formation	Uruguay	A species of Biomphalaria.	
Bittium gliberti	Sp. nov	Valid	Van Dingenen, Ceulemans & Landau	Pliocene (Zanclean)		France	A species of Bittium.	
Bittium lozoueti	Sp. nov	Valid	Van Dingenen, Ceulemans & Landau	Pliocene (Zanclean)		France	A species of Bittium.	
Caecum aartseni	Sp. nov	Valid	Van Dingenen, Ceulemans & Landau	Pliocene (Zanclean)		France	A species of Caecum.	
Caecum benhami	Sp. nov	Valid	Goedert & Raines	Early Eocene	Crescent Formation	United States (Washington)	A species of Caecum.	
Caecum bensoni	Sp. nov	Valid	Goedert & Raines	Latest Eocene or earliest Oligocene	Gries Ranch Formation	United States (Washington)	A species of Caecum.	
Califostoma	Gen. et comb. et sp. nov	Valid	Bean & Vermeij	Pliocene	San Diego Formation	United States (California)	A member of Muricidae. The type species is "Purpura" turris Nomland (1916); genus also includes new species C. rotundivaricosum.	
Calliostoma namnetense	Sp. nov	Valid	Landau, Ceulemans & Van Dingenen	Pliocene (Zanclean)		France	A species of Calliostoma.	
Cambodgia acuminata	Sp. nov	Valid	Nützel & Ketwetsuriya in Ketwetsuriya, Nützel & Kanjanapayont	Permian (Wordian)	Tak Fa Formation	Thailand	A member of Caenogastropoda belonging to the family Meekospiridae.	
Cancellaria bajaensis	Sp. nov	Valid	Perrilliat & Cristín	Late Paleocene		Mexico	A member of Cancellariidae, a species of Cancellaria.	
Cancellaria paleocenica	Sp. nov	Valid	Perrilliat & Cristín	Late Paleocene		Mexico	A member of Cancellariidae, a species of Cancellaria.	
Cantaurea	Gen. et sp. nov	Valid	Landau, da Silva & Heitz	Miocene	Cantaure Formation	Venezuela	A member of Tornidae. The type species is C. mperforata.	
Carnevalea	Gen. et comb. nov	Valid	Harzhauser & Neubauer in Harzhauser et al.	Eocene or Oligocene (Priabonian or early Rupelian)	Zalumah Formation	Oman	A member of Ampullariidae. A new genus for "Lanistes" thaytinitiensis Neubert & Van Damme (2012).	
Cerastus hyznyi	Sp. nov	Valid	Harzhauser & Neubauer in Harzhauser et al.	Eocene or Oligocene (Priabonian or early Rupelian)	Zalumah Formation	Oman	A member of Cerastidae, a species of Cerastus.	
Cerithiopsis (s. l.) moritzhoernesi	Sp. nov	Valid	Landau, da Silva & Heitz	Miocene	Cantaure Formation	Venezuela	A species of Cerithiopsis (sensu lato).	
Cerithiopsis (s. l.) wesselinghi	Sp. nov	Valid	Landau, da Silva & Heitz	Miocene	Cantaure Formation	Venezuela	A species of Cerithiopsis (sensu lato).	
Charadreon wesselinghi	Sp. nov	Valid	Landau, da Silva & Heitz	Miocene	Cantaure Formation	Venezuela	A member of Pachychilidae.	
Chelyconus manueltenorioi	Sp. nov	Valid	Landau, da Silva & Heitz	Miocene	Cantaure Formation	Venezuela	A species of Chelyconus.	
Chiliborus malarguhensis	Sp. nov	Valid	Miquel & Cerdeño	Oligocene (Deseadan)		Argentina	A member of Strophocheilidae.	
Clathrodrillia jungi	Sp. nov	Valid	Landau, da Silva & Heitz	Miocene	Cantaure Formation	Venezuela	A species of Clathrodrillia.	
Clathrodrillia pupaeformis	Sp. nov	Valid	Landau, da Silva & Heitz	Miocene	Cantaure Formation	Venezuela	A species of Clathrodrillia.	
Clathrodrillia totocostata	Sp. nov	Valid	Landau, da Silva & Heitz	Miocene	Cantaure Formation	Venezuela	A species of Clathrodrillia.	
Cocculina reineckei	Sp. nov	Valid	Marquet	Oligocene	Sternberger Gestein	Germany		
Cochliolepis costata	Sp. nov	Valid	Landau, da Silva & Heitz	Miocene	Cantaure Formation	Venezuela	A species of Cochliolepis.	
Cochlis craccoi	Sp. nov	Valid	Robba, Pedriali & Quaggiotto	Miocene (Tortonian)		Italy	A member of Naticidae.	
Cochlis deborgeri	Sp. nov	Valid	Marquet	Oligocene	Boom Clay Formation	Belgium		
Cochlis mortoni	Sp. nov	Valid	Robba, Pedriali & Quaggiotto	Eocene (Ypresian-Lutetian)		Italy	A member of Naticidae.	
Cochlis pedrialii	Sp. nov	Valid	Van Dingenen, Ceulemans & Landau	Pliocene (Zanclean)		France	A member of Naticidae.	
Cochlis pseudovittata	Sp. nov	Valid	Robba, Pedriali & Quaggiotto	Miocene (Tortonian)		Italy	A member of Naticidae.	
Cochlis robbai	Sp. nov	Valid	Van Dingenen, Ceulemans & Landau	Pliocene (Zanclean)		France	A member of Naticidae.	
Colliculus neraudeaui	Sp. nov	Valid	Landau, Ceulemans & Van Dingenen	Pliocene (Zanclean)		France	A species of Colliculus.	
Colubraria praeprocera	Sp. nov	Valid	Landau, da Silva & Heitz	Miocene	Cantaure Formation	Venezuela	A species of Colubraria.	
Conasprella minutissima	Sp. nov	Valid	Harzhauser & Landau	Miocene (Langhian)	Baden Group	Austria	A species of Conasprella.	
Conilithes eichwaldi	Nom. nov	Valid	Harzhauser & Landau	Miocene (Langhian or Serravallian)		Ukraine	A species of Conilithes; a replacement name for Conus exiguus Eichwald (1830).	
Conomitra cantaurana	Sp. nov	Valid	Landau, da Silva & Heitz	Miocene	Cantaure Formation	Venezuela	A species of Conomitra.	
Contina	Nom. nov	Valid	Di Cencio	Jurassic		Italy	A replacement name for Vacekia Conti & Szabó (1989).	
Costoanachis lacrima	Sp. nov	Valid	Landau, da Silva & Heitz	Miocene	Cantaure Formation	Venezuela	A species of Costoanachis.	
Costoanachis paraguanensis	Sp. nov	Valid	Landau, da Silva & Heitz	Miocene	Cantaure Formation	Venezuela	A species of Costoanachis.	
Crisilla ariejansseni	Sp. nov	Valid	Van Dingenen, Ceulemans & Landau	Pliocene (Zanclean)		France	A species of Crisilla.	
Crommium hosgori	Sp. nov	Valid	Pacaud	Late Paleocene-early Eocene	Kırkkavak Formation	Turkey		
Cyclostomaria praemonarii	Sp. nov	Valid	Szabó	Early Jurassic (Sinemurian to early Pliensbachian)	Hierlatz Limestone	Austria	A member of the family Gosseletinidae.	
Cyclostremiscus basicostatus	Sp. nov	Valid	Landau, da Silva & Heitz	Miocene	Cantaure Formation	Venezuela	A member of Tornidae.	
Cyclostremiscus forticarinatus	Sp. nov	Valid	Landau, da Silva & Heitz	Miocene	Cantaure Formation	Venezuela	A member of Tornidae.	
Cymia hodsonorum	Sp. nov	Valid	Landau, da Silva & Heitz	Miocene	Cantaure Formation	Venezuela	A species of Cymia.	
?Cyproglobina leroyi	Sp. nov	Valid	Dolin & Aguerre	Eocene (Ypresian)		France	A member of the family Cypraeidae. Subsequently transferred to the genus Gigantocrossia by Dolin & Garvie (2026).	
Dentimides	Gen. et comb. nov	Valid	Landau, da Silva & Heitz	Oligocene–Pliocene	Brasso Formation; Cantaure Formation; Chipola Formation; Culebra Formation; Duale Formation; Tabera Formation; Zorritos Formation	Colombia; Dominican Republic; Ecuador; Guatemala; Panama; Peru; Trinidad and Tobago (Trinidad); United States (Florida); Venezuela	A member of Potamididae; a new genus for "Cerithium" suprasulcatum Gabb (1873).	
Dorsanum strigoniense	Sp. nov	Valid	Kovács & Vicián	Late Oligocene – Early Miocene		Hungary	A species of Dorsanum.	
Dorsina peterjungi	Sp. nov	Valid	Landau, da Silva & Heitz	Miocene	Cantaure Formation	Venezuela	A member of Columbellidae.	
Drepanocheilus bataviensis	Sp. nov	Valid	Wild & Stilwell	Early Cretaceous (Albian)		Batavia Knoll, the western edge of the Perth Abyssal Plain, eastern Indian Ocean	A member of Aporrhaidae.	
Echinolittorina nielseni	Sp. nov	Valid	Araya & Reid	Pleistocene		Chile	A species of Echinolittorina.	
Eirlysia ceramicorum	Sp. nov	Valid	Peel	Carboniferous (Namurian)	Morridge Formation	United Kingdom		
Elachisina crassilabrata	Sp. nov	Valid	Landau, da Silva & Heitz	Miocene	Cantaure Formation	Venezuela	A member of Elachisinidae.	
Elmira shimantoensis	Sp. nov	Valid	Kiel & Nobuhara in Nobuhara et al.	Late Cretaceous	Sada Limestone	Japan		
Emarginula brebioni	Sp. nov	Valid	Landau, Ceulemans & Van Dingenen	Pliocene (Zanclean)		France	A species of Emarginula.	
Emmericia lucana	Sp. nov	Valid	Esu, Girotti & Pisegna Cerone	Middle Pleistocene	Mercure Basin	Italy	A species of Emmericia.	
Engoniophos schmidti	Sp. nov	Valid	Landau, da Silva & Heitz	Miocene	Cantaure Formation	Venezuela	A species of Engoniophos.	
Entemnotrochus rumphii kushimotoensis	Subsp. nov	Valid	Tomida & Sako	Miocene	Shikiya Formation	Japan		
Eocypraea lefevrei	Sp. nov	Valid	Dolin & Aguerre	Eocene (Ypresian)		France	A member of the family Ovulidae or Eocypraeidae.	
Eoquickia	Gen. et comb. nov	Valid	Harzhauser & Neubauer in Harzhauser et al.	Eocene or Oligocene (Priabonian or early Rupelian)	Zalumah Formation	Oman	A member of Succineidae. The type species is "Succinea" omanensis Neubert & Van Damme (2012).	
Eovoluta	Gen. et 3 sp. et comb. nov	Valid	Pacaud	Eocene		Czech Republic; France; Italy; United States (California; Oregon)	A volute. The type species is E. iolinensis; genus also includes new species, E. volcesiana and E. quaggiottoi, as well as "Mitra" branderi Defrance (1824), "Mitra" lajoyi Deshayes (1835), "Voluta" bouei Deshayes (1865), "Voluta" eomagna Vokes (1939) and "Lyria" coquillensis Turner (1938).	
Erato falconensis	Sp. nov	Valid	Landau, da Silva & Heitz	Miocene	Cantaure Formation	Venezuela	A species of Erato.	
Eucycloidea badamuensis	Sp. nov	Valid	Ferrari, Binazadeh & Kaim	Middle Jurassic (Bajocian)	Badamu Formation	Iran	A member of Eucyclidae.	
Eucypraedia martinezi	Sp. nov	Valid	Dolin & Aguerre	Eocene (Ypresian)		France	A member of Cypraeidae, a species of Eucypraedia.	
Euglyphostoma wendelli	Sp. nov	Valid	Landau, da Silva & Heitz	Miocene	Cantaure Formation	Venezuela	A member of Clathurellidae.	
Euspira gianoi	Sp. nov	Valid	Robba, Pedriali & Quaggiotto	Miocene (Burdigalian to Tortonian)		Italy	A member of Naticidae, a species of Euspira.	
Euspira giuntellii	Sp. nov	Valid	Robba, Pedriali & Quaggiotto	Miocene (Tortonian)		Italy	A member of Naticidae, a species of Euspira.	
Euspira ilhagwilensis	Nom. nov	Valid	Pacaud	Oligocene (Rupelian)		France	A member of Naticidae, a species of Euspira; a replacement name for Natica (Labellinacca) tournoueri Cossmann (1919).	
Euspira latecallosa	Sp. nov	Valid	Robba, Pedriali & Quaggiotto	Miocene (Tortonian)		Italy	A member of Naticidae, a species of Euspira.	
Euspira molarensis	Sp. nov	Valid	Robba, Pedriali & Quaggiotto	Oligocene (Rupelian)		Italy	A member of Naticidae, a species of Euspira.	
Euspira piccolii	Sp. nov	Valid	Robba, Pedriali & Quaggiotto	Eocene (Ypresian-Priabonian)		Italy	A member of Naticidae, a species of Euspira.	
Euspira umbilicocarinata	Sp. nov	Valid	Robba, Pedriali & Quaggiotto	Miocene (Langhian-Tortonian)		Italy	A member of Naticidae, a species of Euspira.	
Euspira umbilicolunata	Sp. nov	Valid	Robba, Pedriali & Quaggiotto	Miocene (Burdigalian-Langhian)		Italy	A member of Naticidae, a species of Euspira.	
Euthria ceddensis	Sp. nov	Valid	Brunetti & Della Bella	Pliocene		Italy	A member of Buccinidae, a species of Euthria.	
Falsimargarita parvispira	Sp. nov	Valid	Quilty et al.	Pliocene	Sørsdal Formation	Antarctica	A species of Falsimargarita.	
Faunus (Faunus) effetus	Sp. nov	Valid	Berezovsky in Berezovsky & Girik	Eocene		Ukraine	A member of the family Pachychilidae.	
Favartia milleti	Nom. nov	Valid	Ceulemans et al.	Pliocene (Zanclean)		France	A member of Muricidae, a species of Favartia; a replacement name for Murex lineatus Millet (1865).	
Ficus yesimae	Sp. nov	Valid	Landau, da Silva & Heitz	Miocene	Cantaure Formation	Venezuela	A species of Ficus.	
Foveolaria	Gen. et comb. et 5 sp. nov	Junior homonym	Szabó	Early Jurassic (Sinemurian to Pliensbachian)	Hierlatz Limestone	Austria; France; Hungary	A possible member of Pithodeidae. The type species is "Wortheniopsis (Sisenna)" lokutensis Szabó (2009); genus also includes F. trochoidea (Eudes-Deslongchamps, 1849), F. subturrita (Eudes-Deslongchamps, 1849), F. turrita (Eudes-Deslongchamps, 1849), F. procera (Eudes-Deslongchamps, 1849), F. pinguis (Eudes-Deslongchamps, 1849), F. ellipsoidea (Eudes-Deslongchamps, 1849), F. urkutensis (Szabó, 2009), F. hierlatzensis (Szabó, 2009) and F. jancsii (Szabó, 2009), as well as new species F. bicarinata, F. conoidea, F. globosa, F. suemegensis and F. kocsisi. The generic name is preoccupied by Foveolaria Busk (1884); Szabó (2018) coined a replacement name Kericserispira.	
Freboldia	Gen. et sp. nov	Valid	Nützel & Schneider in Nützel et al.	Early Jurassic (late Pliensbachian)	Heiberg Formation	Canada (Nunavut)	A member of Bellerophinidae. The type species is Freboldia fluitans.	
Fusinus clavilithoides	Sp. nov	Valid	Landau et al.	Miocene (Serravallian)	Karaman Basin	Turkey	A species of Fusinus.	
Fusiturricula capeloi	Sp. nov	Valid	Landau, da Silva & Heitz	Miocene	Cantaure Formation	Venezuela	A species of Fusiturricula.	
Gastrocopta patagonica	Sp. nov	Valid	Miquel & Rodriguez	Early Miocene		Argentina	A species of Gastrocopta.	
Gemmula woodringi	Sp. nov	Valid	Landau, da Silva & Heitz	Miocene	Cantaure Formation	Venezuela	A species of Gemmula	
Gibbula milleti	Sp. nov	Valid	Landau, Ceulemans & Van Dingenen	Pliocene (Zanclean)		France	A species of Gibbula.	
Gibbula provosti	Sp. nov	Valid	Landau, Ceulemans & Van Dingenen	Pliocene (Zanclean)		France	A species of Gibbula.	
Glabrocingulum magnum	Sp. nov	Valid	Nützel & Ketwetsuriya in Ketwetsuriya, Nützel & Kanjanapayont	Permian (Wordian)	Tak Fa Formation	Thailand	A member of the family Eotomariidae.	
Glabrocingulum parvum	Sp. nov	Valid	Foster, Danise & Twitchett	Early Triassic	Vikinghøgda Formation	Norway	A member of the family Eotomariidae.	
Globidrillia lanceolata	Sp. nov	Valid	Landau, da Silva & Heitz	Miocene	Cantaure Formation	Venezuela	A species of Globidrillia.	
Globidrillia minutissima	Sp. nov	Valid	Landau, da Silva & Heitz	Miocene	Cantaure Formation	Venezuela	A species of Globidrillia.	
Glyphostoma inornatum	Sp. nov	Valid	Landau, da Silva & Heitz	Miocene	Cantaure Formation	Venezuela	A species of Glyphostoma.	
Glyphostoma pauciornatum	Sp. nov	Valid	Landau, da Silva & Heitz	Miocene	Cantaure Formation	Venezuela	A species of Glyphostoma.	
Glyptaesopus crocotillus	Sp. nov	Valid	Landau, da Silva & Heitz	Miocene	Cantaure Formation	Venezuela	A species of Glyptaesopus.	
Glyptaesopus tuckeri	Sp. nov	Valid	Landau, da Silva & Heitz	Miocene	Cantaure Formation	Venezuela	A species of Glyptaesopus.	
Glyptophos	Gen. et sp. nov	Valid	Landau, da Silva & Heitz	Miocene	Cantaure Formation	Venezuela	A member of Photinae. The type species is G. furreri.	
Goniasma tricarinata	Sp. nov	Valid	Nützel & Ketwetsuriya in Ketwetsuriya, Nützel & Kanjanapayont	Permian (Wordian)	Tak Fa Formation	Thailand	A member of Goniasmatidae.	
Goniodomulus	Gen. et sp. nov	Valid	Harzhauser & Neubauer in Harzhauser et al.	Eocene or Oligocene (Priabonian or early Rupelian)	Zalumah Formation	Oman	A member of Streptaxidae. The type species is Goniodomulus solaniformis.	
Gradiconus johntuckeri	Sp. nov	Valid	Landau, da Silva & Heitz	Miocene	Cantaure Formation	Venezuela	A species of Gradiconus.	
Gymnentome (Craginia) beurleni	Sp. nov	Valid	Pereira, Cassab & Barreto	Early Cretaceous	Romualdo Formation	Brazil	A member of Cassiopidae.	
"Gyroscala" berasteguii	Sp. nov	Valid	Calzada & Adserà	Late Cretaceous (Campanian)		Spain	A wentletrap of uncertain phylogenetic placement.	
Gyroscala cantaurana	Sp. nov	Valid	Landau, da Silva & Heitz	Miocene	Cantaure Formation	Venezuela	A wentletrap.	
Gyroscala lilliputiana	Sp. nov	Valid	Landau, da Silva & Heitz	Miocene	Cantaure Formation	Venezuela	A wentletrap.	
Gyroscala paraguanensis	Sp. nov	Valid	Landau, da Silva & Heitz	Miocene	Cantaure Formation	Venezuela	A wentletrap.	
Hemiconus fallax	Sp. nov	Valid	Pacaud	Eocene (Ypresian)		France	A member of Hemiconidae.	
Hemisinus miocenicus	Sp. nov	Valid	Landau, da Silva & Heitz	Miocene	Cantaure Formation	Venezuela	A species of Hemisinus.	
Hesperaptyxis meridionalis	Nom. nov	Valid	Callomon & Snyder	Pliocene		Ecuador	A member of Fasciolariidae; a replacement name for Latirus melvilli Dall & Ochsner (1928).	
Hesperisternia parva	Sp. nov	Valid	Landau, da Silva & Heitz	Miocene	Cantaure Formation	Venezuela	A species of Hesperisternia.	
Hesperisternia vermeiji	Sp. nov	Valid	Landau, da Silva & Heitz	Miocene	Cantaure Formation	Venezuela	A species of Hesperisternia.	
Hexaplex (Trunculariopsis) ledoni	Sp. nov	Valid	Ceulemans et al.	Pliocene (Zanclean)		France	A member of Muricidae, a species of Hexaplex.	
Hindsiclava wiedenmayeri	Sp. nov	Valid	Landau, da Silva & Heitz	Miocene	Cantaure Formation	Venezuela	A species of Hindsiclava.	
Igonoia levimargarita	Sp. nov	Valid	Wild & Stilwell	Early Cretaceous (Albian)		Batavia Knoll, the western edge of the Perth Abyssal Plain, eastern Indian Ocean	A member of Margaritidae.	
Illyricella	Gen. et sp. nov	Valid	Neubauer, Mandic & Harzhauser	Miocene (Langhian)	Prozor Basin	Bosnia and Herzegovina	A member of Hydrobiidae, possibly a member of Pyrgulinae. The type species is Illyricella dzepiensis.	
Insulivitrina ingridae	Sp. nov	Valid	Margry			Canary Islands	A species of Insulivitrina.	
Jujubinus armatus	Sp. nov	Valid	Landau, Ceulemans & Van Dingenen	Pliocene (Zanclean)		France	A species of Jujubinus.	
Jujubinus condevicnumensis	Sp. nov	Valid	Landau, Ceulemans & Van Dingenen	Pliocene (Zanclean)		France	A species of Jujubinus.	
Jujubinus ligeriensis	Sp. nov	Valid	Landau, Ceulemans & Van Dingenen	Pliocene (Zanclean)		France	A species of Jujubinus.	
Jujubinus pigeonblancensis	Sp. nov	Valid	Landau, Ceulemans & Van Dingenen	Pliocene (Zanclean)		France	A species of Jujubinus.	
Kalloconus hendricksi	Sp. nov	Valid	Harzhauser & Landau	Miocene		Austria; Bulgaria; Hungary; Italy; Poland; Portugal; Romania	A species of Kalloconus.	
Kalloconus letkesensis	Sp. nov	Valid	Harzhauser & Landau	Miocene (Langhian)	Sámsonháza Formation	Hungary	A species of Kalloconus.	
Kalloconus pseudohungaricus	Sp. nov	Valid	Harzhauser & Landau	Miocene (Langhian)		Romania	A species of Kalloconus.	
Kazankiella	Nom. nov	Valid	Mazaev	Permian (Kazanian)		Russia	A member of Orthonematidae. A replacement name for Kazanella Mazaev (2015).	
Khumerspira thailandensis	Sp. nov	Valid	Nützel & Ketwetsuriya in Ketwetsuriya, Nützel & Kanjanapayont	Permian (Wordian)	Tak Fa Formation	Thailand	A member of the family Bellerophontidae.	
Knefastia aenigmatica	Sp. nov	Valid	Landau, da Silva & Heitz	Miocene	Cantaure Formation	Venezuela	A species of Knefastia	
Knefastia cubaguaensis	Sp. nov	Valid	Landau, da Silva & Heitz	Early Pliocene	Araya Formation	Venezuela	A species of Knefastia	
Knefastia etteri	Sp. nov	Valid	Landau, da Silva & Heitz	Miocene	Cantaure Formation	Venezuela	A species of Knefastia	
Knightinella ornata	Sp. nov	Valid	Nützel & Ketwetsuriya in Ketwetsuriya, Nützel & Kanjanapayont	Permian (Wordian)	Tak Fa Formation	Thailand	A member of the family Trochonematidae.	
Koskinakra	Gen. et sp. nov	Valid	Harzhauser et al.	Oligocene (Rupelian)	Danişmen Formation	Turkey	A member of Rissoidae. The type species is Koskinakra thracica.	
Lautoconus kovacsi	Sp. nov	Valid	Harzhauser & Landau	Miocene (Langhian)	Sámsonháza Formation	France; Hungary	A species of Lautoconus.	
Lautoconus pestensis	Sp. nov	Valid	Harzhauser & Landau	Miocene (Langhian)	Sámsonháza Formation	Bosnia and Herzegovina; Hungary	A species of Lautoconus.	
Lautoconus quaggaoides	Sp. nov	Valid	Harzhauser & Landau	Miocene (Langhian)	Sámsonháza Formation	Hungary	A species of Lautoconus.	
Leporiconus paratethyianus	Sp. nov	Valid	Harzhauser & Landau	Miocene (Langhian)	Sámsonháza Formation	Hungary	A species of Leporiconus.	
Limacina novacaesarea	Sp. nov	Valid	Janssen & Sessa in Janssen, Sessa & Thomas	Eocene (Ypresian)	Marlboro Clay	United States (New Jersey)	A species of Limacina.	
Liotina blaia	Sp. nov	Valid	Pacaud & Ledon	Eocene (Bartonian)		France	A species of Liotina.	
Liraloron	Gen. et sp. nov	Valid	Peel	Carboniferous (Namurian)	Morridge Formation	United Kingdom	The type species is L. cornoviorum.	
Lithopoma minutum	Sp. nov	Valid	Landau, da Silva & Heitz	Miocene	Cantaure Formation	Venezuela	A species of Lithopoma.	
Macromphalina massicardi	Nom. nov	Valid	Van Dingenen, Ceulemans & Landau	Miocene		France	A species of Macromphalina; a replacement name for Macromphalina bouryi (de Morgan, 1915).	
Macromphalina partimsculpturata	Sp. nov	Valid	Landau, da Silva & Heitz	Miocene	Cantaure Formation	Venezuela	A species of Macromphalina.	
Mangelia angulicosta	Sp. nov	Valid	Scarponi et al.	Miocene (early Serravallian)	Pidhirtsi Beds	Ukraine	A member of Mangeliidae, a species of Mangelia.	
Mangelia larga	Sp. nov	Valid	Scarponi et al.	Miocene (early Serravallian)	Pidhirtsi Beds	Ukraine	A member of Mangeliidae, a species of Mangelia.	
Mangelia odovychenae	Sp. nov	Valid	Scarponi et al.	Miocene (early Serravallian)	Pidhirtsi Beds	Ukraine	A member of Mangeliidae, a species of Mangelia.	
Mangelia pseudorugulosa	Sp. nov	Valid	Scarponi et al.	Miocene (early Serravallian)	Pidhirtsi Beds	Ukraine	A member of Mangeliidae, a species of Mangelia.	
Marevalvata basilaevis	Sp. nov	Valid	Landau, da Silva & Heitz	Miocene	Cantaure Formation	Venezuela	A member of Areneidae.	
Marginella seguenzai	Sp. nov	Valid	La Perna & Vazzana	Early Pleistocene		Italy	A species of Marginella.	
Marginocystiscus	Gen. et sp. nov	Valid	Landau, da Silva & Heitz	Miocene	Cantaure Formation	Venezuela	A member of Cystiscidae. The type species M. subtilplicatus.	
Mazatlania parva	Sp. nov	Valid	Landau, da Silva & Heitz	Miocene	Cantaure Formation	Venezuela	A species of Mazatlania.	
Medfracaulus sinelnikovae	Sp. nov	Valid	Mazaev	Carboniferous (Moscovian)		Russia	A member of Ptychocaulidae.	
Meekospira acrolopha	Sp. nov	Valid	Peel	Carboniferous (Namurian)	Morridge Formation	United Kingdom		
Megasurcula centroamericana	Sp. nov	Valid	Landau, da Silva & Heitz	Miocene	Cantaure Formation	Venezuela	A species of Megasurcula	
Merica krocki	Sp. nov	Valid	Kovács & Vicián	Late Oligocene – Early Miocene		Hungary	A species of Merica.	
Mesalia? kushea	Sp. nov	Valid	Cataldo & Lazo	Early Cretaceous (Hauterivian)	Agrio Formation	Argentina	Possibly a species of Mesalia.	
Metaphos caribbensis	Sp. nov	Valid	Landau, da Silva & Heitz	Miocene	Cantaure Formation	Venezuela	A species of Metaphos.	
Metula quasilaevis	Sp. nov	Valid	Landau, da Silva & Heitz	Miocene	Cantaure Formation	Venezuela	A species of Metula.	
Microdoma carinata	Sp. nov	Valid	Nützel & Ketwetsuriya in Ketwetsuriya, Nützel & Kanjanapayont	Permian (Wordian)	Tak Fa Formation	Thailand	A member of the family Microdomatidae.	
Microgaza landreauensis	Sp. nov	Valid	Landau, Ceulemans & Van Dingenen	Pliocene (Zanclean)		France	A species of Microgaza.	
Mitrella longispira	Sp. nov	Valid	Landau, da Silva & Heitz	Miocene	Cantaure Formation	Venezuela	A species of Mitrella.	
Mitrella tutata	Sp. nov	Valid	Landau, da Silva & Heitz	Miocene	Cantaure Formation	Venezuela	A species of Mitrella.	
Moelleriopsis krylovi	Sp. nov	Valid	Marquet	Oligocene	Boom Clay Formation	Belgium		
Nanarius gardnerae	Sp. nov	Valid	Landau, da Silva & Heitz	Miocene	Cantaure Formation	Venezuela	A member of Nassariidae.	
Nassarius kugleri	Sp. nov	Valid	Landau, da Silva & Heitz	Miocene	Cantaure Formation	Venezuela	A species of Nassarius.	
Neilsonia coatesi	Sp. nov	Valid	Peel	Carboniferous (Namurian)	Morridge Formation	United Kingdom		
Neilsonia ganneyica	Sp. nov	Valid	Peel	Carboniferous (Namurian)	Morridge Formation	United Kingdom		
Neritina daani	Sp. nov	Valid	Landau, da Silva & Heitz	Miocene	Cantaure Formation	Venezuela	A species of Neritina.	
Neritina daisyae	Sp. nov	Valid	Landau, da Silva & Heitz	Miocene	Cantaure Formation	Venezuela	A species of Neritina.	
Neritina isabelae	Sp. nov	Valid	Landau, da Silva & Heitz	Miocene	Cantaure Formation	Venezuela	A species of Neritina.	
Neritina meesi	Sp. nov	Valid	Landau, da Silva & Heitz	Miocene	Cantaure Formation	Venezuela	A species of Neritina.	
Neritina nunoi	Sp. nov	Valid	Landau, da Silva & Heitz	Miocene	Cantaure Formation	Venezuela	A species of Neritina.	
Neritina seani	Sp. nov	Valid	Landau, da Silva & Heitz	Miocene	Cantaure Formation	Venezuela	A species of Neritina.	
Neritodryas marqueti	Sp. nov	Valid	Symonds	Eocene (Ypresian)		France	A species of Neritodryas.	
Nipponomaria	Gen. et comb. nov	Valid	Asato et al.	Permian	Akasaka Limestone	Japan; Turkey	A member of Pleurotomarioidea. Genus includes "Pleurotomaria" yokoyamai Hayasaka and "Pleurotomaria" anatolica Enderle.	
Niso dollfusi	Sp. nov	Valid	Van Dingenen, Ceulemans & Landau	Pliocene (Zanclean)		France	A species of Niso.	
Niso leenaertsi	Sp. nov	Valid	Marquet	Oligocene	Boom Clay Formation	Belgium		
Nystia guillotini	Sp. nov	Valid	Van Dingenen, Ceulemans & Landau	Pliocene (Zanclean)		France	A species of Nystia.	
Ochetoclava jungi	Sp. nov	Valid	Landau, da Silva & Heitz	Miocene	Cantaure Formation	Venezuela	A member of Cerithiidae.	
Ocinebrina lauriatrageae	Sp. nov	Valid	Ceulemans et al.	Pliocene (Zanclean)		France	A member of Muricidae, a species of Ocinebrina.	
Oligodia palumbina	Sp. nov	Valid	Van Dingenen, Ceulemans & Landau	Pliocene (Zanclean)		France		
Olivella paucidentata	Sp. nov	Valid	Landau, da Silva & Heitz	Miocene	Cantaure Formation	Venezuela	A species of Olivella.	
Olivella robustodentata	Sp. nov	Valid	Landau, da Silva & Heitz	Miocene	Cantaure Formation	Venezuela	A species of Olivella.	
Omanifera	Gen. et sp. nov	Valid	Nordsieck in Harzhauser et al.	Eocene or Oligocene (Priabonian or early Rupelian)	Zalumah Formation	Oman	A member of Clausiliidae. The type species is Omanifera euclista.	
Omanillya	Gen. et 2 sp. nov	Valid	Nordsieck in Harzhauser et al.	Eocene or Oligocene (Priabonian or early Rupelian)	Zalumah Formation	Oman	A member of Clausiliidae. The type species is Omanillya lunellifera; genus also contains Omanillya costellata.	
Omanitopsis	Gen. et comb. et sp. nov	Valid	Harzhauser & Neubauer in Harzhauser et al.	Eocene or Oligocene (Priabonian or early Rupelian)	Zalumah Formation	Oman	A member of Pomatiidae. The type species is "Cyclotopsis" praecursor Neubert & Van Damme (2012); genus also contains new species Omanitopsis vandammei.	
Omocordella	Gen. et comb. nov	Valid	Harper	Early Devonian		United States (Tennessee)	A member of Micromphalidae; a new genus for "Distemnostoma" curtum Dunbar (1920).	
Pacaudiella	Gen. et 2 sp. nov	Valid	Harzhauser & Neubauer in Harzhauser et al.	Eocene or Oligocene (Priabonian or early Rupelian)	Zalumah Formation	Oman	A member of Stylommatophora belonging to the family Vidaliellidae. The type species is Pacaudiella omanica; genus also contains Pacaudiella flammulata.	
Pachycrommium javadvipense	Nom. nov	Valid	Pacaud	Miocene (Burdigalian)	Rembang Formation	Indonesia	A member of the family Ampullinidae; a replacement name for Ampullina (Ampullospira) harrisi Pannekoek (1936).	
Pachycrommium misrense	Sp. nov	Valid	Pacaud	Eocene (Lutetian)		Egypt	A member of the family Ampullinidae.	
Pachycrommium soror	Sp. nov	Valid	Pacaud	Eocene (Bartonian)		Egypt	A member of the family Ampullinidae.	
Pachycrommium tihense	Sp. nov	Valid	Pacaud	Eocene (Bartonian)		Egypt	A member of the family Ampullinidae.	
Palaeocyclotus kuehschelmi	Sp. nov	Valid	Harzhauser & Neubauer in Harzhauser et al.	Eocene or Oligocene (Priabonian or early Rupelian)	Zalumah Formation	Oman	A member of Pomatiidae, a species of Palaeocyclotus.	
Parvisipho oligocaenica	Sp. nov	Valid	Marquet, Lenaerts & Laporte	Early Oligocene		Belgium		
Patagocharopa	Gen. et sp. nov	Valid	Miquel & Rodriguez	Early Miocene		Argentina	Probably a member of Charopidae. The type species is Patagocharopa enigmatica.	
Patellilabia britannica	Sp. nov	Valid	Peel	Carboniferous (Namurian)	Morridge Formation	United Kingdom		
Payraudeautia bituberculata	Sp. nov	Valid	Robba, Pedriali & Quaggiotto	Miocene (Tortonian)		Italy	A member of Naticidae, a species of Payraudeautia.	
Payraudeautia crassicorda	Sp. nov	Valid	Robba, Pedriali & Quaggiotto	Eocene (early Lutetian)		Italy	A member of Naticidae, a species of Payraudeautia.	
Payraudeautia pigeonblancensis	Sp. nov	Valid	Van Dingenen, Ceulemans & Landau	Pliocene (Zanclean)		France	A member of Naticidae, a species of Payraudeautia.	
Payraudeautia zarantonelloi	Sp. nov	Valid	Robba, Pedriali & Quaggiotto	Eocene (Ypresian-Lutetian)		Italy	A member of Naticidae, a species of Payraudeautia.	
Pharkidonotus khaonoiensis	Sp. nov	Valid	Nützel & Ketwetsuriya in Ketwetsuriya, Nützel & Kanjanapayont	Permian (Wordian)	Tak Fa Formation	Thailand	A member of the family Bellerophontidae.	
Pila neuberti	Sp. nov	Valid	Harzhauser & Neubauer in Harzhauser et al.	Eocene or Oligocene (Priabonian or early Rupelian)	Zalumah Formation	Oman	A member of Ampullariidae, a species of Pila.	
Pisania mariavictoriae	Sp. nov	Valid	Brunetti & Della Bella	Pliocene		Italy	A member of Buccinidae, a species of Pisania.	
Plagioconus bellissimus	Sp. nov	Valid	Harzhauser & Landau	Miocene (Langhian)		Hungary; Romania	A species of Plagioconus.	
Plagioconus breitenbergeri	Sp. nov	Valid	Harzhauser & Landau	Miocene (Langhian)	Sámsonháza Formation	Hungary	A species of Plagioconus.	
Planolateralus acanthanodus	Sp. nov	Valid	Wild & Stilwell	Early Cretaceous (Albian)		Batavia Knoll, the western edge of the Perth Abyssal Plain, eastern Indian Ocean	A member of Calliotropidae.	
Platyceras (Platyceras) emmemmjae	Sp. nov	Valid	Cook & Jell	Carboniferous (Tournaisian)		Australia	A member of Platyceratidae, a species of Platyceras.	
Pliconacca tortonensis	Sp. nov	Valid	Robba, Pedriali & Quaggiotto	Miocene (Tortonian)		Italy	A member of Naticidae, a species of Pliconacca.	
Polinices jungi	Sp. nov	Valid	Landau, da Silva & Heitz	Miocene	Cantaure Formation	Venezuela	A species of Polinices.	
Procerithium arenacollicola	Sp. nov	Valid	Wild & Stilwell	Early Cretaceous (Albian)		Batavia Knoll, the western edge of the Perth Abyssal Plain, eastern Indian Ocean	A member of Procerithiidae.	
Procyclotopsis eocenica	Sp. nov	Valid	Harzhauser & Neubauer in Harzhauser et al.	Eocene or Oligocene (Priabonian or early Rupelian)	Zalumah Formation	Oman	A member of Pomatiidae, a species of Procyclotopsis.	
Projenneria obesa	Sp. nov	Valid	Zamberlan & Checchi	Eocene (late Ypresian-early Lutetian)		Italy	A member of Pediculariinae.	
Projenneria prisca	Sp. nov	Valid	Zamberlan & Checchi	Eocene (late Ypresian-early Lutetian)		Italy	A member of Pediculariinae.	
Prososthenia benvenutii	Sp. nov	Valid	Esu & Girotti	Late Early Pleistocene		Italy	A member of Hydrobiidae, a species of Prososthenia.	
Prososthenia pesae	Sp. nov	Valid	Esu & Girotti	Early Pliocene		Italy	A member of Hydrobiidae, a species of Prososthenia.	
Prososthenia sambuci	Sp. nov	Valid	Esu & Girotti	Early Pliocene		Italy	A member of Hydrobiidae, a species of Prososthenia.	
Pseudomesalia (Pseudomesalia) mennessieri	Sp. nov	Valid	Pereira, Cassab & Barreto	Early Cretaceous	Romualdo Formation	Brazil	A member of Cassiopidae.	
Pseudomesalia (Pseudomesalia) santanensis	Sp. nov	Valid	Pereira, Cassab & Barreto	Early Cretaceous	Romualdo Formation	Brazil	A member of Cassiopidae.	
Pugilina katalinae	Sp. nov	Valid	Kovács & Vicián	Late Oligocene – Early Miocene		Hungary	A species of Pugilina.	
Punctum patagonicum	Sp. nov	Valid	Miquel & Rodriguez	Early Miocene		Argentina	A species of Punctum.	
Pyrgocythara turrispiralata	Sp. nov	Valid	Scarponi et al.	Miocene (early Serravallian)	Pidhirtsi Beds	Ukraine	A member of Mangeliidae, a species of Pyrgocythara.	
Pyrgula subdola	Sp. nov	Valid	Esu & Girotti	Early Pliocene		Italy	A species of Pyrgula.	
Pyrgula vinearum	Sp. nov	Valid	Esu & Girotti	Early Pliocene		Italy	A species of Pyrgula.	
Pyrgulella	Gen. et sp. nov	Valid	Harzhauser, Neubauer & Kadolsky in Harzhauser et al.	Eocene or Oligocene (Priabonian or early Rupelian)	Zalumah Formation	Oman	A member of Truncatelloidea, possibly a member of Hydrobiidae. The type species is Pyrgulella parva.	
Pyrunculus totostriatus	Sp. nov	Valid	Landau, da Silva & Heitz	Miocene	Cantaure Formation	Venezuela	A member of Retusidae.	
Raphitoma grimmertingenensis	Sp. nov	Valid	Marquet, Lenaerts & Laporte	Early Oligocene		Belgium	A species of Raphitoma.	
Raphitoma neerrepenensis	Sp. nov	Valid	Marquet, Lenaerts & Laporte	Early Oligocene		Belgium	A species of Raphitoma.	
Retispira mowensis	Sp. nov	Valid	Peel	Carboniferous (Namurian)	Morridge Formation	United Kingdom		
Ringicula collaris	Sp. nov	Valid	Landau, da Silva & Heitz	Miocene	Cantaure Formation	Venezuela	A species of Ringicula	
Rissoa pouweri	Sp. nov	Valid	Van Dingenen, Ceulemans & Landau	Pliocene (Zanclean)		France	A species of Rissoa.	
Salalahia	Gen. et sp. nov	Valid	Kadolsky, Harzhauser & Neubauer in Harzhauser et al.	Eocene or Oligocene (Priabonian or early Rupelian)	Zalumah Formation	Oman	A member of Truncatelloidea, possibly a member of Hydrobiidae. The type species is Salalahia thaytinitiensis.	
Scalenostoma conicum	Sp. nov	Valid	Landau, da Silva & Heitz	Miocene	Cantaure Formation	Venezuela	A species of Scalenostoma.	
Seila cantaurana	Sp. nov	Valid	Landau, da Silva & Heitz	Miocene	Cantaure Formation	Venezuela	A species of Seila.	
Sengoeria	Gen. et sp. nov	Valid	Harzhauser et al.	Oligocene (Rupelian)	Danişmen Formation	Turkey	A member of Thiaridae. The type species is Sengoeria thracica.	
Sigaretotrema checchii	Sp. nov	Valid	Robba, Pedriali & Quaggiotto	Eocene (Lutetian)		Italy	A member of Naticidae, a species of Sigaretotrema.	
Sigatica claudiae	Sp. nov	Valid	Robba, Pedriali & Quaggiotto	Eocene (Ypresian-Lutetian)		Italy	A member of Naticidae, a species of Sigatica.	
Sigatica eleonorae	Sp. nov	Valid	Robba, Pedriali & Quaggiotto	Eocene (Ypresian-Lutetian)		Italy	A member of Naticidae, a species of Sigatica.	
Sinum borellense	Sp. nov	Valid	Robba, Pedriali & Quaggiotto	Miocene (Tortonian)		Italy	A member of Naticidae, a species of Sinum.	
Sinum paviai	Sp. nov	Valid	Robba, Pedriali & Quaggiotto	Miocene (Tortonian)		Italy	A member of Naticidae, a species of Sinum.	
Solariorbis pilsbryi	Sp. nov	Valid	Landau, da Silva & Heitz	Miocene	Cantaure Formation	Venezuela	A member of Tornidae.	
Solenosteira (Fusinosteira) primitiva	Sp. nov	Valid	Landau, da Silva & Heitz	Miocene	Cantaure Formation	Venezuela	A species of Solenosteira.	
Steironepion variabile	Sp. nov	Valid	Landau, da Silva & Heitz	Miocene	Cantaure Formation	Venezuela	A species of Steironepion.	
Stephopoma ruedigeri	Sp. nov	Valid	Landau, da Silva & Heitz	Miocene	Cantaure Formation	Venezuela	A species of Stephopoma.	
Strioterebrum sinuosocostatum	Sp. nov	Valid	Landau, da Silva & Heitz	Miocene	Cantaure Formation	Venezuela	A species of Strioterebrum	
Strombinophos pilsbryi	Sp. nov	Valid	Landau, da Silva & Heitz	Miocene	Cantaure Formation	Venezuela	A member of Photinae.	
Sveltia nemethi	Sp. nov	Valid	Kovács & Vicián	Late Oligocene – Early Miocene		Hungary	A species of Sveltia.	
Takfaia	Gen. et sp. nov	Valid	Nützel & Ketwetsuriya in Ketwetsuriya, Nützel & Kanjanapayont	Permian (Wordian)	Tak Fa Formation	Thailand	A member of the family Eotomariidae. The type species is T. kuesi.	
Tectonatica albertii	Sp. nov	Valid	Robba, Pedriali & Quaggiotto	Oligocene (Rupelian)		Italy	A member of Naticidae, a species of Tectonatica.	
Tectonatica burtoni altavillensis	Subsp. nov	Valid	Robba, Pedriali & Quaggiotto	Eocene and Oligocene (Priabonian-Rupelian)		Italy	A member of Naticidae, a subspecies of Tectonatica burtoni.	
Tectonatica consimilis	Sp. nov	Valid	Robba, Pedriali & Quaggiotto	Miocene (Tortonian)		Italy	A member of Naticidae, a species of Tectonatica.	
Tectonatica rupeliana	Sp. nov	Valid	Robba, Pedriali & Quaggiotto	Oligocene (Rupelian)		Italy	A member of Naticidae, a species of Tectonatica.	
?Tectus columbinus	Sp. nov	Valid	Landau, Ceulemans & Van Dingenen	Pliocene (Zanclean)		France	Possibly a species of Tectus.	
Teinostoma olssoni	Sp. nov	Valid	Landau, da Silva & Heitz	Miocene	Cantaure Formation	Venezuela	A species of Teinostoma.	
Terebellum koeneni	Nom. nov	Valid	Marquet, Lenaerts & Laporte	Oligocene		Belgium; Germany	A species of Terebellum; a replacement name for Terebellum striatum Koenen (1889).	
Terebra apporrecta	Sp. nov	Valid	Landau, da Silva & Heitz	Miocene	Cantaure Formation	Venezuela	A species of Terebra	
Terebra harzhauseri	Sp. nov	Valid	Landau, da Silva & Heitz	Miocene	Cantaure Formation	Venezuela	A species of Terebra	
Terebra kronenbergi	Sp. nov	Valid	Landau, da Silva & Heitz	Miocene	Cantaure Formation	Venezuela	A species of Terebra	
Teremelon onoua	Sp. nov	Valid	Stilwell	Late Paleocene-early Eocene	Red Bluff Tuff	New Zealand	A volute related to member of the genus Zidona.	
Torqueoliva	Gen. et comb. et sp. nov	Valid	Landau, da Silva & Heitz	Miocene	Cantaure Formation; Cercado Formation; Chipola Formation; Grand Bay Formation	Dominican Republic; Grenada (Carriacou); United States (Florida); Venezuela	An olive snail. The type species is "Oliva (Omogymna)" martensii Dall (1903); genus also includes "Oliva" lioides Dall (1903), "Oliva" gradata Gabb (1873), "Oliva (Omogymna)" farleyensis Drez (1997) and "Oliva (Omogymna?)" valens Jung (1971), as well as new species T. strictotorquata.	
Trachydomia takhliensis	Sp. nov	Valid	Nützel & Ketwetsuriya in Ketwetsuriya, Nützel & Kanjanapayont	Permian (Wordian)	Tak Fa Formation	Thailand	A member of Cycloneritimorpha belonging to the family Trachyspiridae.	
Transovula grenieri	Sp. nov	Valid	Dolin & Aguerre	Eocene (Ypresian)		France	A member of the family Ovulidae.	
Transovula pattedoiei	Sp. nov	Valid	Dolin & Aguerre	Eocene (Ypresian)		France	A member of the family Ovulidae.	
Trochita angusticostata	Sp. nov	Valid	Landau, da Silva & Heitz	Miocene	Cantaure Formation	Venezuela	A species of Trochita.	
Trochita paucicostata	Sp. nov	Valid	Landau, da Silva & Heitz	Miocene	Cantaure Formation	Venezuela	A species of Trochita.	
Truncatella andymurrayi	Sp. nov	Valid	Schmelz & Portell	Early Miocene	Chipola Formation	United States (Florida)	A species of Truncatella.	
Truncatella chipolana	Sp. nov	Valid	Schmelz & Portell	Early Miocene	Chipola Formation	United States (Florida)	A species of Truncatella.	
Truncatella sarasotaensis	Sp. nov	Valid	Schmelz & Portell	Late Pliocene to early Pleistocene	Tamiami Formation	United States (Florida)	A species of Truncatella.	
Tympanotonos redoniensis	Sp. nov	Valid	Van Dingenen, Ceulemans & Landau	Pliocene (Zanclean)		France	A species of Tympanotonos.	
Vermetus dufraigni	Sp. nov	Valid	Marquet	Oligocene		Belgium		
Vitta rumeliana	Sp. nov	Valid	Harzhauser et al.	Oligocene (Rupelian)	Danişmen Formation	Turkey	A member of Neritidae.	
Viviparus basilicii	Sp. nov	Valid	Esu & Girotti	Late Pliocene?-early Pleistocene		Italy	A species of Viviparus.	
Viviparus martanus	Sp. nov	Valid	Esu & Girotti	Late Pliocene?-early Pleistocene		Italy	A species of Viviparus.	
Volvarina occultospira	Sp. nov	Valid	Landau, da Silva & Heitz	Miocene	Cantaure Formation	Venezuela	A species of Volvarina.	
Wangaluta	Gen. et sp. et comb. nov	Valid	Stilwell	Paleocene	Wangaloa Formation	New Zealand	A volute, possibly a member of Fulgorariinae. Genus includes new species W. henaconstricta and possibly also W? neozelanica (Finlay & Marwick, 1937).	
Woodringilla lentiformis	Sp. nov	Valid	Landau, da Silva & Heitz	Miocene	Cantaure Formation	Venezuela	A member of Tornidae.	
Wortheniopsis bakonyensis	Sp. nov	Valid	Szabó	Early Jurassic (Sinemurian)	Hierlatz Limestone	Hungary	A possible member of Pithodeidae.	
Wortheniopsis rakusi	Sp. nov	Valid	Szabó	Early Jurassic (Sinemurian to early Pliensbachian)	Hierlatz Limestone	Austria	A possible member of Pithodeidae.	
Xenophora atrebatum	Sp. nov	Valid	Pacaud	Eocene		United Kingdom	A species of Xenophora.	
Xenophora guanensis	Sp. nov	Valid	Pacaud	Eocene		France	A species of Xenophora.	
Xenophora isara	Sp. nov	Valid	Pacaud	Eocene		France	A species of Xenophora.	
Xenophora josianae	Sp. nov	Valid	Pacaud	Eocene		France	A species of Xenophora.	
Xenophora lozoueti	Sp. nov	Valid	Pacaud	Oligocene		France	A species of Xenophora.	
Xenophora nilssoni	Nom. nov	Valid	Pacaud	Late Cretaceous		Austria; Bulgaria; Czech Republic; Germany; Poland; Sweden; Ukraine	A species of Xenophora; a replacement name for Trochus onustus Nilsson (1827).	
Xenophora teuleraensis	Sp. nov	Valid	Pacaud	Eocene		France	A species of Xenophora.	
Yunnania pulchra	Sp. nov	Valid	Nützel & Ketwetsuriya in Ketwetsuriya, Nützel & Kanjanapayont	Permian (Wordian)	Tak Fa Formation	Thailand	A member of Trochoidea belonging to the family Araeonematidae.	
Zanassarina phosiformis	Sp. nov	Valid	Landau, da Silva & Heitz	Miocene	Cantaure Formation	Venezuela	A member of Columbellidae.	
Zilchogyra miocenica	Sp. nov	Valid	Miquel & Rodriguez	Early Miocene		Argentina	A species of Zilchogyra.	

== Other molluscs ==
=== Research ===
- Fossil pearls attached to the shells of members of the genus Anodonta are described from the Pleistocene Nihewan Formation (China) by Li et al. (2016).

=== New taxa ===
Name	Novelty	Status	Authors	Age	Unit	Location	Notes	Images
Adamussium necopinatum	Sp. nov	Valid	Quilty et al.	Pliocene	Sørsdal Formation	Antarctica	A species of Adamussium.	
Adipicola apenninica	Sp. nov	Valid	Danise, Bertolaso & Dominici	Miocene (Langhian)	Pantano Formation	Italy	A mussel, a species of Adipicola.	
Aequiyoldia defossata	Sp. nov	Valid	Quilty et al.	Pliocene	Sørsdal Formation	Antarctica	A bivalve, a species of Aequiyoldia.	
Alencasterites	Gen. et comb. nov	Valid	Pons, Vicens & Schmidt-Effing	Late Cretaceous		Costa Rica; Jamaica	A rudist; the type species is A. mooretownensis (Trechmann, 1924).	
Arabitrigonia pillayi	Sp. nov	Valid	Cooper	Early Cretaceous (late Albian)	Mzinene Formation	South Africa	A bivalve belonging to the family Pterotrigoniidae, a species of Arabitrigonia.	
Arabitrigonia schneideri	Sp. nov	Valid	Cooper	Late Cretaceous (Cenomanian)		Lebanon	A bivalve belonging to the family Pterotrigoniidae, a species of Arabitrigonia.	
Archaeounio	Gen. et sp. nov	Disputed	Koarai & Matsukawa	Late Cretaceous	Tetori Group	Japan	An unionid bivalve. Genus includes A. kagaensis. Isaji (2025) considered the genus Archaeounio to be a junior synonym of the genus Nakamuranaia, though the author maintained A. kagaensis as a distinct species within the latter genus.	
Argutostrea	Gen. et comb. nov	Valid	Kosenko in Kosenko & Seltser	Middle and Late Jurassic (Callovian-Tithonian)		Russia	A bivalve belonging to the superfamily Ostreoidea; a new genus for "Liostrea" roemeri (Quenstedt).	
Asturianaia	Gen. et 2 sp. nov	Valid	Delvene et al.	Late Jurassic (Kimmeridgian)		Spain	A bivalve belonging to the group Unionida. Genus includes Asturianaia colunghensis and Asturianaia lastrensis.	
Ataviaconcha	Gen. et sp. nov	Valid	Hryniewicz et al.	Devonian (c. 390 Mya)		Morocco	A modiomorphid bivalve. The type species is Ataviaconcha wendti.	
Austrotindaria antiqua	Sp. nov	Valid	Foster, Danise & Twitchett	Early Triassic	Vikinghøgda Formation	Norway	A bivalve belonging to the family Neilonellidae.	
Austrotindaria svalbardensis	Sp. nov	Valid	Foster, Danise & Twitchett	Early Triassic	Vikinghøgda Formation	Norway	A bivalve belonging to the family Neilonellidae.	
Breviarca baghensis	Sp. nov	Valid	Kumar et al.	Late Cretaceous (Turonian)		India	A bivalve belonging to the subfamily Noetiinae, a species of Breviarca.	
Bucardium grateloupianum	Sp. nov	Valid	La Perna	Miocene		France	A cockle.	
Capitoconus borealis	Sp. nov	Valid	Peel et al.	Cambrian	Henson Gletscher Formation	Greenland	A helcionellid.	
Chiton sulcomarginatus	Sp. nov	Valid	Dell'Angelo et al.	Miocene (Langhian) to Pliocene		Italy	A chiton belonging to the family Chitonidae, a species of Chiton.	
Coxitrigonia	Gen. et comb. nov	Valid	Cooper	Jurassic (Bajocian-Oxfordian)		Australia; India; Kenya	A bivalve belonging to the family Pleurotrigoniidae. The type species is "Trigonia" moorei Lycett in Moore (1870); genus also includes C. brevicostata (Kitchin, 1903), C. distincta (Kitchin, 1903) and C. tealei (Cox, 1937).	
Craspedochiton brunettii	Sp. nov	Valid	Dell'Angelo et al.	Miocene (Tortonian)		Italy	A chiton belonging to the family Acanthochitonidae, a species of Craspedochiton.	
Crassatella pedroi	Sp. nov	Valid	DeVries	Eocene (early Priabonian)	Pisco Basin	Peru	A bivalve belonging to the family Crassatellidae; a species of Crassatella.	
Crassatella portelli	Sp. nov	Valid	DeVries	Early Oligocene	Suwannee Limestone	United States (Florida)	A bivalve belonging to the family Crassatellidae; a species of Crassatella.	
Crassatella rafaeli	Sp. nov	Valid	DeVries	Eocene (early Priabonian)	Pisco Basin	Peru	A bivalve belonging to the family Crassatellidae; a species of Crassatella.	
Cyclocardia magna	Sp. nov	Valid	Quilty et al.	Pliocene	Sørsdal Formation	Antarctica	A species of Cyclocardia.	
Dystactella? eisenmanni	Sp. nov	Valid	Hryniewicz et al.	Devonian (c. 390 Mya)		Morocco	A solemyid bivalve, possibly a species of Dystactella.	
Europicardium hoernesi	Sp. nov	Valid	La Perna	Miocene		Austria	A cockle, a species of Europicardium.	
Galeacalvus	Gen. et sp. nov	Valid	Jacquet & Brock	Early Cambrian	Hawker Group	Australia	A helcionelloid. The type species is Galeacalvus coronarius.	
Ghuneriella	Gen. et comb. nov	Valid	Cooper	Early Cretaceous (late Valanginian)		India	A bivalve belonging to the family Pleurotrigoniidae. The type species is "Trigonia" spissicostata Kitchin (1903).	
Glyptoleda parenica	Sp. nov	Valid	Biakov	Permian (Kungurian-Roadian)		Russia	A nuculanoid bivalve.	
Gnesioceramus mowriensis	Sp. nov	Valid	Walaszczyk & Cobban	Late Cretaceous (Cenomanian)	Mowry Shale	United States	An inoceramid bivalve; a species of Gnesioceramus.	
Granocardium (Granocardium) douiri	Sp. nov	Valid	Benzaggagh	Early Cretaceous (Albian)		Morocco	A cockle.	
Gryphaeostrea sanjuanicus	Sp. nov	Valid	Morales-Ortega et al.	Eocene	Bateque Formation	Mexico	A member of Gryphaeidae.	
Guanacastea	Gen. et sp. nov	Valid	Pons, Vicens & Schmidt-Effing	Late Cretaceous (Campanian)		Costa Rica	A rudist. Genus includes new species Guanacastea costaricaensis.	
Helcionella histosia	Sp. nov	Valid	Jacquet & Brock	Early Cambrian	Hawker Group	Australia	A helcionelloid, a species of Helcionella.	
Huncalotis	Gen. et sp. et comb. nov	Valid	Damborenea & Leanza	Late Jurassic	Vaca Muerta Formation	Argentina; Peru?	A pectinoid bivalve. The type species is Huncalotis millaini; genus might also include "Obliquipecten" peruanum Rivera.	
Hybolophus disenum	Sp. nov	Valid	DeVries	Late Eocene or early Oligocene	Mirador or Mancora Formation	Peru	A bivalve belonging to the family Crassatellidae; a species of Hybolophus.	
Hybolophus maleficae	Sp. nov	Valid	DeVries	Miocene (Serravallian)	Pisco Formation	Peru	A bivalve belonging to the family Crassatellidae; a species of Hybolophus.	
Hybolophus terrestris	Sp. nov	Valid	DeVries	Miocene (Tortonian to Messinian)	Pisco Basin	Peru	A bivalve belonging to the family Crassatellidae; a species of Hybolophus.	
Ilsanella enallaxa	Sp. nov	Valid	Jacquet & Brock	Early Cambrian	Hawker Group	Australia	A helcionelloid, a species of Ilsanella.	
Kalolophus	Gen. et comb. nov	Valid	DeVries	Miocene to recent		Jamaica; Mexico; Panama; United States; Venezuela	A bivalve belonging to the family Crassatellidae. The type species is "Crassatellites" chipolanus Dall (1903); genus also includes fossil taxa "Crassatellites" densus Dall (1900), "Crassatellites" jamaicensis Dall (1903), "Eucrassatella" mansfieldi MacNeil (1936) and "Crassatellites" mediamericanus Brown and Pilsbry (1913), as well as extant species "Crassatella" antillarum Reeve (1842) and "Crassatella" speciosa Adams (1854).	
Kellygonia	Gen. et comb. nov	Valid	Cooper	Early Cretaceous (Aptian–late Albian)		Antarctica (Alexander Island); Australia; India	A bivalve belonging to the family Pleurotrigoniidae. The type species is "Trigonia" cardiniiformis Kitchin (1903); genus also includes "Eselaevitrigonia" macdonaldi Kelly (1995) and K. skwarkoi (Nakano, 1970).	
Kitchingonia	Gen. et comb. nov	Valid	Cooper	Late Jurassic (late Oxfordian – early Kimmeridgian)		India; Papua New Guinea	A bivalve belonging to the family Pleurotrigoniidae. The type species is "Trigonia" trapeziformis Kitchin (1903); genus also includes "Trigonia" dhosaensis Kitchin (1903) and "Eselaevitrigonia" tyna Skwarko (1981).	
Maragonia	Gen. et comb. nov	Valid	Cooper	Early Cretaceous (Barremian–late Albian)		Antarctica (Alexander Island); Australia	A bivalve belonging to the family Trigoniidae. The type species is "Nototrigonia" ponticula Skwarko (1963).	
Margaritifera? lagriega	Sp. nov	Valid	Delvene et al.	Late Jurassic (Kimmeridgian)		Spain	A bivalve belonging to the group Unionida; possibly a species of Margaritifera.	
Minastirithella	Gen. et sp. nov	Valid	Jacquet & Brock	Early Cambrian	Hawker Group	Australia	A helcionelloid. The type species is Minastirithella silivreni.	
Mitrocaprina costaricaensis	Sp. nov	Valid	Pons, Vicens & Schmidt-Effing	Late Cretaceous (Campanian)		Costa Rica	A rudist	
Modiolopsis pojetai	Sp. nov	Valid	Jakobsen et al.	Ordovician (Darriwilian)	Stairway Sandstone	Australia	A bivalve belonging to the group Mytiloida and the family Modiolopsidae.	
Mujanaia	Gen. et sp. nov	Valid	Delvene et al.	Late Jurassic (Kimmeridgian)		Spain	A bivalve belonging to the group Unionida. The type species is Mujanaia abeuensis.	
Nambangonia	Gen. et comb. nov	Valid	Cooper	Late Jurassic (late Tithonian)		Tanzania	A bivalve belonging to the family Pleurotrigoniidae. The type species is "Trigonia (Indotrigonia)" vstriata Aitken (1961).	
Neopisthotrigonia	Gen. et comb. nov	Valid	Cooper	Early Cretaceous (Barremian – Aptian)		Australia	A bivalve belonging to the family Pleurotrigoniidae. The type species is "Opisthotrigonia" roperi Skwarko (1963); genus also includes "Trigonia" nasuta Etheridge (1872).	
Nicaniella (Trautscholdia) nagaoi	Nom. nov	Valid	Matsubara	Early Cretaceous	Hiraiga Formation	Japan	A bivalve; a replacement name for Astarte minor Nagao (1934).	
Nippononaia (Thainippononaia)	Subgen. et sp. nov	Valid	Chen & Stiller	Early Cretaceous		Spain; Thailand	A bivalve, a subgenus of Nippononaia. The type species is Nippononaia carinata Kobayashi (1968); the subgenus also includes new species N. hispaniensis.	
Nucinella nakremi	Sp. nov	Valid	Foster, Danise & Twitchett	Early Triassic	Vikinghøgda Formation	Norway	A bivalve belonging to the group Solemyoida and the family Nucinellidae.	
Nucinella taylori	Sp. nov	Valid	Foster, Danise & Twitchett	Early Triassic	Vikinghøgda Formation	Norway	A bivalve belonging to the group Solemyoida and the family Nucinellidae.	
Nuculopsis guangxiensis	Sp. nov	Valid	Yang et al.	Permian-Triassic boundary		China	A bivalve, a species of Nuculopsis.	
Palaeolima fangi	Sp. nov	Valid	Yang et al.	Permian-Triassic boundary		China	A bivalve, a species of Palaeolima.	
Papuagonia	Gen. et comb. nov	Valid	Cooper	Late Cretaceous (early Cenomanian)		Papua New Guinea	A bivalve belonging to the family Pleurotrigoniidae. The type species is "Trigonia" papuana Glaessner (1958).	
Paraglans lydiae	Sp. nov	Valid	Pacaud & Merle	Paleocene (Danian)		France	A bivalve belonging to the family Carditidae; a species of Paraglans.	
Parallelodon changhsingensis	Sp. nov	Valid	Yang et al.	Permian-Triassic boundary		China	A bivalve, a species of Parallelodon.	
Pholadidea gradzinskii	Sp. nov	Valid	Hryniewicz & Gaździcki	Oligocene	Polonez Cove Formation	Antarctica (King George Island)	A bivalve belonging to the family Pholadidae, a species of Pholadidea.	
Pleurotrigonia jacobseni	Sp. nov	Valid	Cooper	Early Cretaceous (Albian)	Mzinene Formation	South Africa	A bivalve belonging to the family Trigoniidae, a species of Pleurotrigonia.	
Posidonioceramus	Gen. et comb. et sp. nov	Valid	Walaszczyk & Cobban	Late Cretaceous (Cenomanian)		Canada; United States	An inoceramid bivalve. Genus includes new species Posidonioceramus merewetheri, as well as Posidonioceramus goodrichensis (McLearn, 1943), Posidonioceramus moberliensis (McLearn, 1943), Posidonioceramus nahwisi (McLearn, 1943), Posidonioceramus athabaskensis (McLearn, 1943) and Posidonioceramus dunveganensis (McLearn, 1926).	
Querandigonia	Gen. et comb. nov	Valid	Cooper	Late Cretaceous (Maastrichtian)		Argentina	A bivalve belonging to the family Pleurotrigoniidae. The type species is "Austrotrigonia" pampeana Leanza & Casadío (1991).	
Ruthipecten campestris	Sp. nov	Valid	Quilty et al.	Pliocene	Sørsdal Formation	Antarctica	A bivalve, a species of Ruthipecten.	
Semeloidea (s. l.) bexhavenensis	Sp. nov	Valid	Saether et al.	Miocene		New Zealand	A kelly clam.	
Sphenia praepusilla	Sp. nov	Valid	Harzhauser et al.	Oligocene (Rupelian)	Danişmen Formation	Turkey	A bivalve belonging to the family Myidae.	
Sthenodonta paenesymmetrica	Sp. nov	Valid	Jakobsen et al.	Ordovician (Darriwilian)	Stairway Sandstone	Australia	A bivalve belonging to the group Nuculoida and the family Nucularcidae.	
Tilicrassatella	Gen. et comb. et 2 sp. nov	Valid	DeVries	Oligocene (Chattian) to Miocene (Langhian)		Chile; Peru	A bivalve belonging to the family Crassatellidae. The type species is "Crassatellites" ponderosa Philippi (1887); genus also includes new species T. torrens and T. sanmartini.	
Tribelopoma	Gen. et sp. nov	Valid	Jacquet, Jago & Brock	Cambrian	Heatherdale Shale	Australia	A member of Helcionelloida, possibly a helcionellid. The type species is T. amygdala.	
'Unio' asturianus	Sp. nov	Valid	Delvene et al.	Late Jurassic (Kimmeridgian)		Spain	A bivalve belonging to the group Unionida; possibly a species of Unio.	
Vanhoepenella	Gen. et sp. nov	Valid	Cooper	Early Cretaceous (late Albian)	Mzinene Formation	South Africa	A bivalve belonging to the family Trigoniidae. The type species is Vanhoepenella brendae.	
Venericardia elisabethae	Sp. nov	Valid	Pacaud & Merle	Paleocene (Danian)		France	A bivalve belonging to the family Carditidae; a species of Venericardia.	
