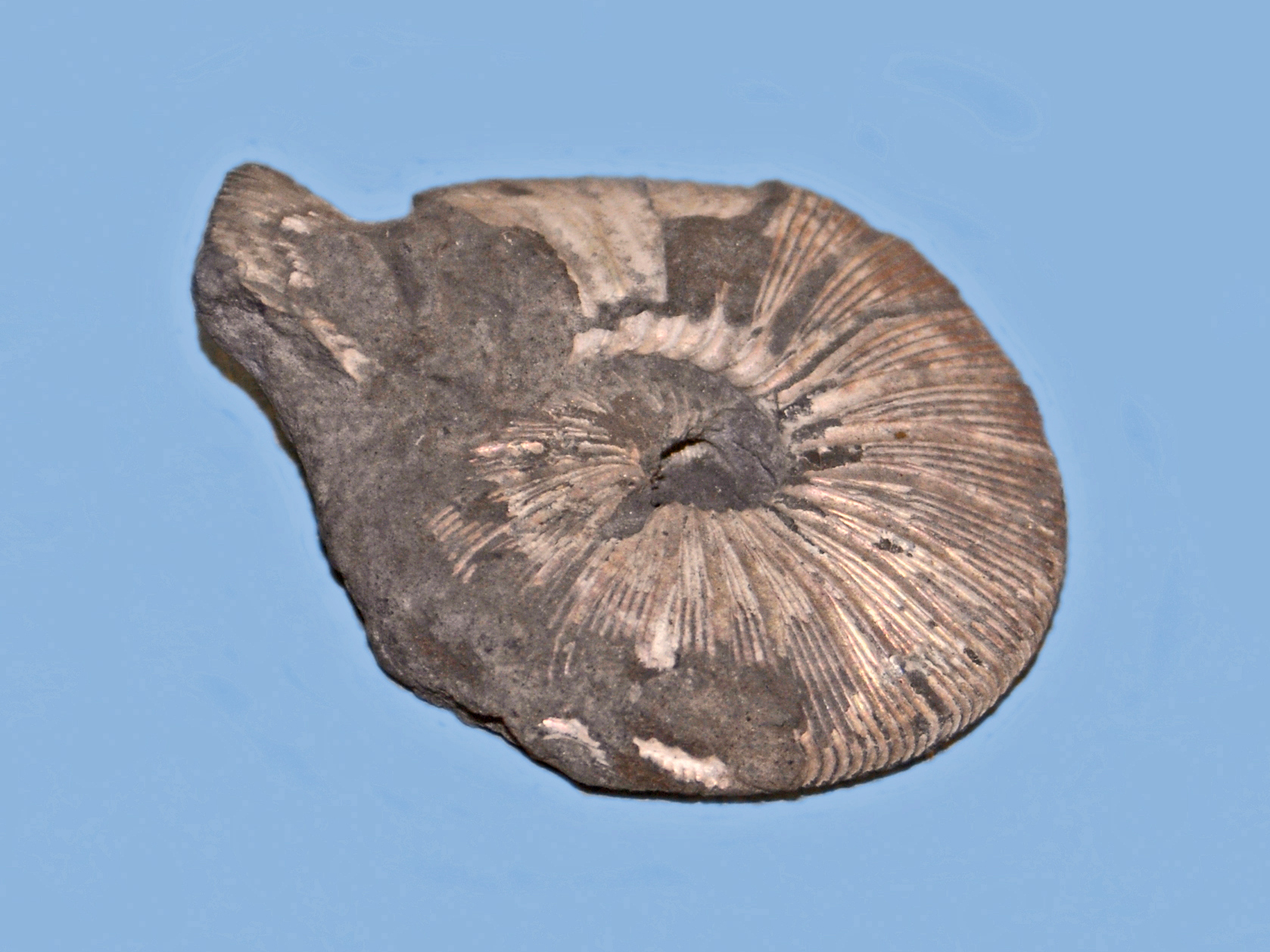
- Fossil shell of Virgatites virgatus from Russia, on display at Galerie de paléontologie et d'anatomie comparée in Paris

Scientific classification
- Kingdom: Animalia
- Phylum: Mollusca
- Class: Cephalopoda
- Subclass: †Ammonoidea
- Order: †Ammonitida
- Family: †Perisphinctidae
- Genus: †Virgatites (Pavlov, 1892)

= Virgatites =

Virgatites Temporal range: Upper Jurassic, 150.8–145.5 Ma

Genus of molluscs (fossil)

Virgatites is an extinct genus of ammonoid cephalopod belonging to the family Perisphinctidae. Related genera in the Virgatitinae include Acuticostites and Zaraiskites. Species in this genus were fast-moving nektonic carnivores.

== Species ==
- Virgatites virgatus (Buch 1830)
- Virgatites pallasianus (d'Orbigny, 1845)
- Virgatites sosia (Vischniakoff 1882)
- Virgatites larisae Mitta 1983
- Virgatites gerassimovi Mitta 1983
- Virgatites crassicostatus Mitta 1987
- Virgatites rarecostatus Rogov 2017

Phragmocône de Virgatites virgatus du Tithonien (Volgien) de la Région de Moscou en Russie, numéro 1625, 47mm de diamètre. Disponible sur ammonobase.fr

== Description ==
Viratites has a ribbed evolute shell without tubercles.

== Distribution ==
These cephalopods lived during the Volgan stage (or Tithonian age) of the upper Jurassic in what is now the Russian Platform.
