= Cosentini =

Cosentini is an Italian surname.

The roots of the name can be traced to Cosenza in the region of Calabria.

== People ==
Notable people with the surname include:

- Nicola Cosentini (born 1988), Italian footballer
- William R. Cosentini (1911–1954), American mechanical engineer and businessman who founded Cosentini Associates

== Companies ==
- Cosentini Associates, mechanical engineering firm based in New York City

== Other ==
- Mazatlania cosentini, a species of sea snails
