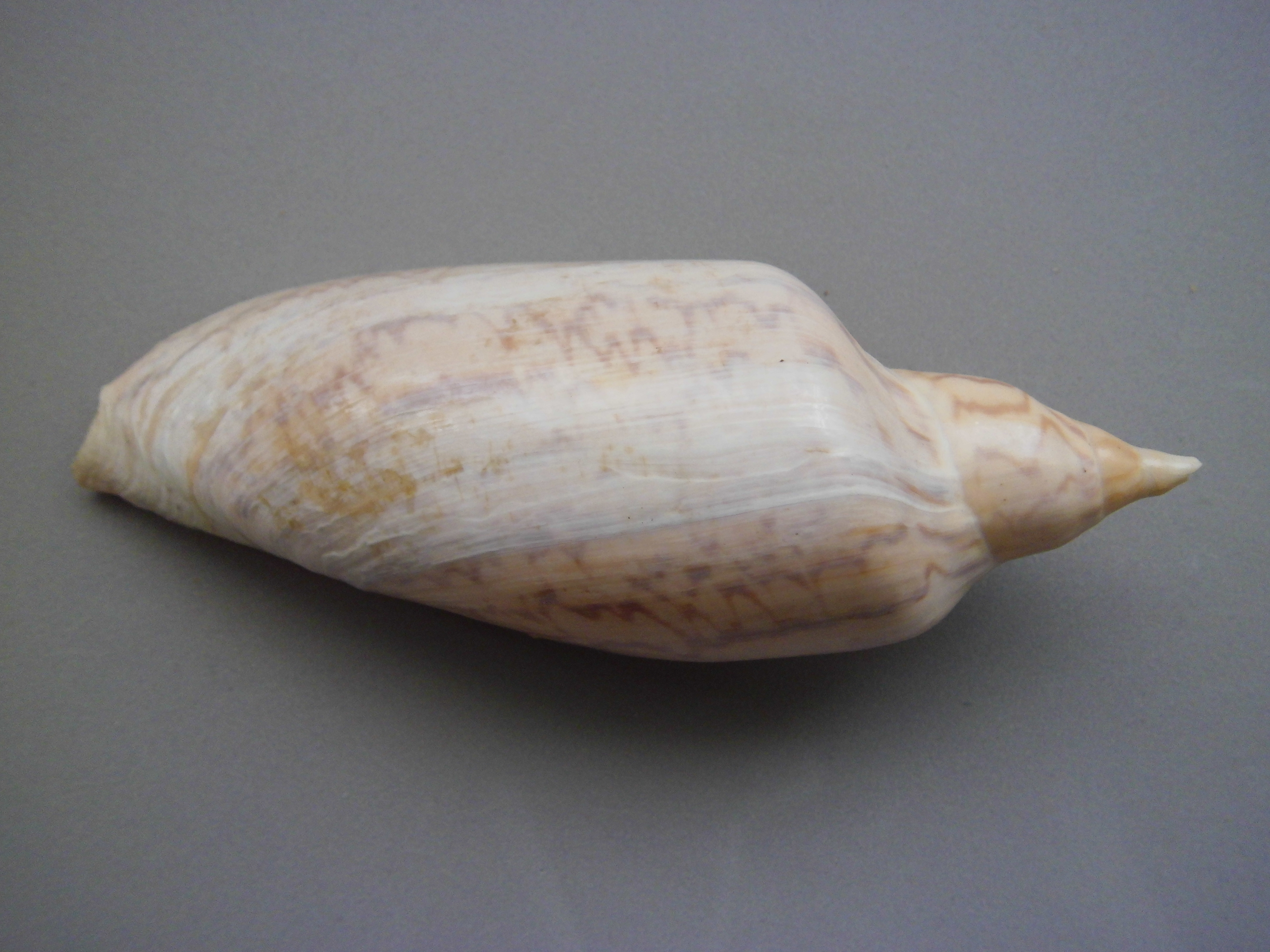

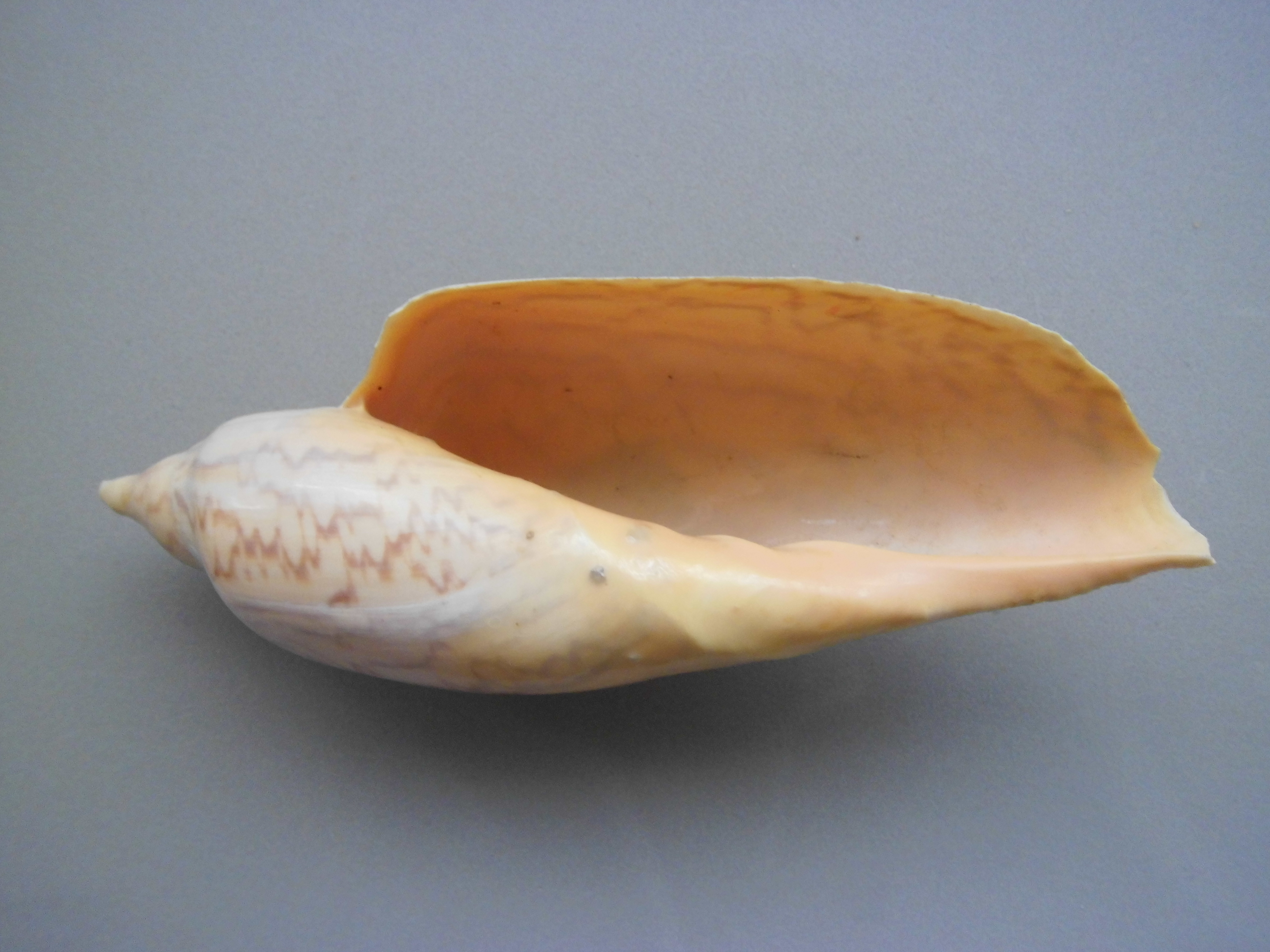

Scientific classification
- Kingdom: Animalia
- Phylum: Mollusca
- Class: Gastropoda
- Subclass: Caenogastropoda
- Order: Neogastropoda
- Family: Volutidae
- Genus: Zidona
- Species: Z. dufresnii

Binomial name
- Zidona dufresnii (Donovan, 1823)

Synonyms
- Voluta angulata Swainson, 1821; Voluta nasica Schubert & Wager, 1829

= Zidona dufresnii =

Species of gastropod

Zidona dufresnii is a species of sea snail, a marine gastropod mollusc in the family Volutidae, the volutes.

== Description ==
This tall-spired species attains a length of 164 mm.

== Distribution ==
Continental shelf of Uruguay: East coast of South America. Trawled in 5 to 10 metres of water, South Argentina.
