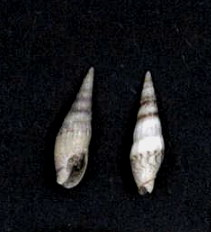
- Two views of a shell of Mazatlania fulgurata (museum specimens at Naturalis Biodiversity Center)

Scientific classification
- Kingdom: Animalia
- Phylum: Mollusca
- Class: Gastropoda
- Subclass: Caenogastropoda
- Order: Neogastropoda
- Family: Columbellidae
- Genus: Mazatlania
- Species: M. fulgurata

Binomial name
- Mazatlania fulgurata (Philippi, 1846)

Synonyms
- Mazatlania hesperia Pilsbry & Lowe, 1932; Terebra arguta Gould, 1853; Terebra fulgurata Philippi, 1846 (original combination); Terebra moolenbeeki Aubry, 1995

= Mazatlania fulgurata =

Species of gastropod

Mazatlania fulgurata is a species of sea snail, a marine gastropod mollusk in the family Columbellidae, the dove snails.

== Description ==
The length of the shell varies between 8 mm and 23 mm.

== Distribution ==
This species occurs in the Caribbean Sea and in the Gulf of Mexico, at 10-20 ft. depth, in sand.
