= Nomismoceratidae =

Scientific classification
- Kingdom: Animalia
- Phylum: Mollusca
- Class: Cephalopoda
- Subclass: †Ammonoidea
- Order: †Goniatitida
- Superfamily: †Nomismoceratoidea
- Family: †Nomismoceratidae; Librovitch 1957

Genera
- Beleutoceras; Cavilentia; Eonomismoceras; Nomismoceras; Pseudonomismoceras; Simmonoceras

Extinct family of molluscs

Nomismoceratidae is one of two families of the superfamily Nomismoceratoidea. They are an extinct group of ammonoid, which are shelled cephalopods related to squids, belemnites, octopuses, and cuttlefish, and more distantly to the nautiloids.
