= Paleostyloidea =

Scientific classification
- Kingdom: Animalia
- Phylum: Mollusca
- Class: Gastropoda
- Subclass: Caenogastropoda
- Superfamily: †Paleostyloidea

Families
- See text

Extinct superfamily of gastropods

Paleostyloidea is an extinct superfamily of fossil sea snails, marine gastropod molluscs in the clade Caenogastropoda.

== Families ==
Families within the superfamily Paleostyloidea are as follows:

- † Family Palaeostylidae
- † Family Goniasmatidae
- † Family Pithodeidae
