= Zaraiskites =

Zaraiskites Temporal range: Tithonian

Scientific classification
- Kingdom: Animalia
- Phylum: Mollusca
- Class: Cephalopoda
- Subclass: †Ammonoidea
- Order: †Ammonitida
- Family: †Perisphinctidae
- Genus: †Zaraiskites; Semenov, 1898

Genus of molluscs (fossil)

Zaraiskites is an extinct genus of ammonoid cephalopod that lived during the Tithonian.

Zaraiskites has a ribbed evolute shell without tubercles. Inner whorls are with normal bifurcate or triplicate ribbing; outer whorl is with virgatotome ribbing with as many as seven secondary ribs taking off successively in front of each primary rib.

Related genera in the Virgatitinae include Acuticostites and Virgatites

== Distribution ==
Zaraiskites have only been found at Kuibyshev Reservoir, Volga River, Russia.
