= Beleutoceras =

Scientific classification
- Kingdom: Animalia
- Phylum: Mollusca
- Class: Cephalopoda
- Subclass: †Ammonoidea
- Order: †Goniatitida
- Family: †Nomismoceratidae
- Genus: †Beleutoceras; Ruzhentzev & Bogoslovskaya, 1971

Genus of molluscs (fossil)

Beleutoceras is a genus belonging to the Nomismoceratidae family. They are an extinct group of ammonoid, which are shelled cephalopods related to squids, belemnites, octopuses, and cuttlefish, and more distantly to the nautiloids.
