= Cheilotomona =

Cheilotomona Temporal range: 242.0–232.0 Ma

Scientific classification
- Kingdom: Animalia
- Phylum: Mollusca
- Class: Gastropoda
- Subclass: Caenogastropoda
- Order: incertae sedis
- Family: †Goniasmatidae
- Genus: †Cheilotomona; Strand, 1928

Species
- Cheilotomona acutocarinata; Cheilotomona avisii; Cheilotomona blumi; Cheilotomona elegans Yin and Yochelson, 1983; Cheilotomona pentagonum

Extinct genus of gastropods

Cheilotomona is an extinct genus of prehistoric marine gastropods in the family Goniasmatidae. The species C. elegans is from a Pelsonian/Illyrian marine shale/marl in the Triassic Qingyan Formation of Guizhou Province, China.
