= Nomismoceratoidea =

Scientific classification
- Kingdom: Animalia
- Phylum: Mollusca
- Class: Cephalopoda
- Subclass: †Ammonoidea
- Order: †Goniatitida
- Suborder: †Goniatitina
- Superfamily: †Nomismoceratoidea; Librovitch, 1957

Families
- Entogonitidae; Nomismoceratidae

Synonyms
- Nomismocerataceae

Extinct superfamily of molluscs

Nomismoceratoidea is one of seventeen superfamilies of the Goniatitina suborder. They are an extinct group of ammonoid, which are shelled cephalopods related to squids, belemnites, octopodes, and cuttlefish, and more distantly to the nautiloids.
