= Crassatella =

- Shell of Crassatella tricarinata

Scientific classification
- Kingdom: Animalia
- Phylum: Mollusca
- Class: Bivalvia
- Order: Carditida
- Superfamily: Crassatelloidea
- Family: Crassatellidae
- Genus: Crassatella; Lamarck, 1799

Type species
- †Mactra cygnea Lamarck, 1799

Synonyms
- Crassatella (Crassatella) Lamarck, 1799 · alternate representation; Crassatella (Landinia) Chavan, 1952 † d; Crassatella (Pachythaerus) Conrad, 1869 †; Crassatella (Riosatella) H. E. Vokes, 1973 · alternate representation; Crassatellites Krüger, 1823 † (Not a valid name under Art. 20: name formed by adding the suffix -ites to the genus name Crassatella); Paphies (Crassatella) Lamarck, 1799

Genus of bivalves

Crassatella is a genus of saltwater clams, marine bivalve molluscs of the order Carditida.

== Species ==
- Crassatella aequatorialis (Jaeckel & Thiele, 1931)
- Crassatella brasiliensis (Dall, 1903)
- Crassatella capensis Lamy, 1917
- Crassatella crebrilirata G. B. Sowerby II, 1870
- † Crassatella duplex Berezovsky, 2004
- † Crassatella gibbosula Lamarck, 1805
- Crassatella gilchristi G. B. Sowerby III, 1904
- † Crassatella hellica d'Orbigny, 1850
- Crassatella knockeri E. A. Smith, 1881
- † Crassatella landinensis Nyst, 1845
- † Crassatella lassa Berezovsky, 2022
- † Crassatella minor Deshayes, 1860
- † Crassatella necopina Berezovsky, 2018
- Crassatella pallida A. Adams & Reeve, 1850
- † Crassatella parisiensis d'Orbigny, 1850
- † Crassatella personata Berezovsky, 2018
- † Crassatella ponderosa (Gmelin, 1791)
- † Crassatella salsensis d’Archiac, 1854
- † Crassatella scutellaria Deshayes, 1824
- † Crassatella singulata Berezovsky, 2018
- † Crassatella sinuosa Deshayes, 1824
- † Crassatella sowerbyi S.V. Wood, 1871
- Crassatella subquadrata G. B. Sowerby II, 1870
- † Crassatella thallavignesi Deshayes, 1857
- Crassatella uruguayensis E. A. Smith, 1880
