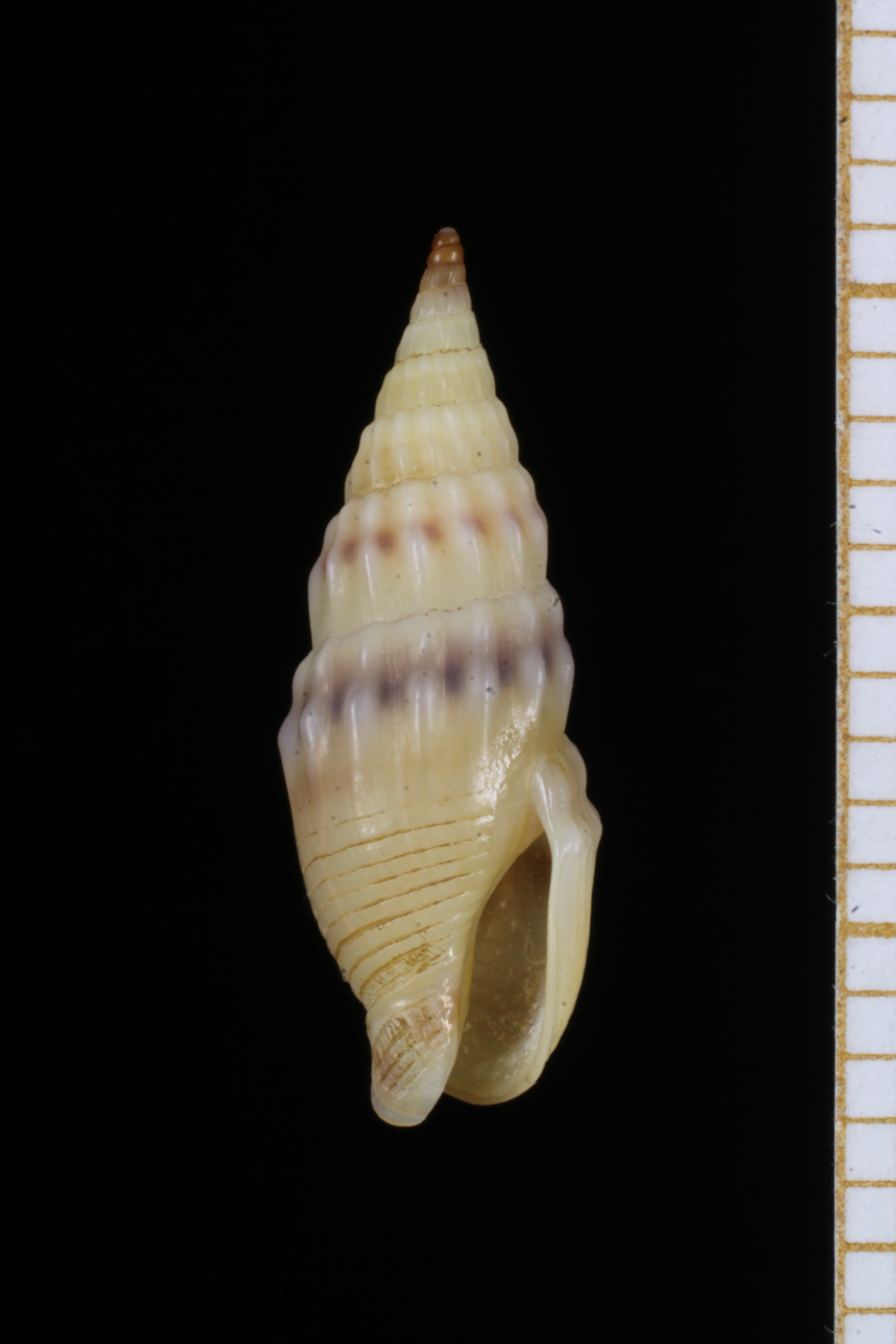
- Shell of Mazatlania cosentini (specimen at MNHN, Paris)

Scientific classification
- Kingdom: Animalia
- Phylum: Mollusca
- Class: Gastropoda
- Subclass: Caenogastropoda
- Order: Neogastropoda
- Family: Columbellidae
- Genus: Mazatlania
- Species: M. cosentini

Binomial name
- Mazatlania cosentini (Philippi, 1836)

Synonyms
- Buccinum aciculatum Lamarck, 1822 (Invalid: Junior homonym of Buccinum aciculatum Gmelin, 1791); Buccinum pulchellum Calcara, 1845 (invalid: junior homonym of Buccinum pulchellum Blainville, 1829, and Buccinum pulchellum Dujardin, 1837); Mazatlania aciculata (Lamarck, 1822); Strombina galba Weisbord, N.E., 1962; Terebra cosentini Philippi, 1836 (original combination); Terebra nodosoplicata Dunker, 1853

= Mazatlania cosentini =

Species of gastropod

Mazatlania cosentini, common name the false auger, is a species of sea snail, a marine gastropod mollusk in the family Columbellidae, the dove snails.

== Description ==
The length of the shell varies between 6 mm and 24 mm.

The elongated shell is narrow and turreted. It is formed of nine or ten very distinct whorls, slightly convex, ornamented with a great number of ribs formed like folds, subnodulous, approximate, numerous, and slightly raised upon the lowest whorl. These ribs are apparent only at the upper part, whilst the base is provided with transverse striae, easily distinguished. The aperture is ovate, and strongly notched. The thin outer lip is sharp and rounded at the lower extremity. The columella is a little bent. The general color is of a yellowish white, ornamented with ferruginous, minute lines, and with a surrounding band of a bluish brown, below each suture. The body whorl presents, towards its base, another larger and deeper colored band, which is obvious within the aperture.

== Distribution ==
This species occurs in the Caribbean Sea.
