= Indonautilus =

Indonautilus Temporal range: Middle - Late Triassic

Scientific classification
- Kingdom: Animalia
- Phylum: Mollusca
- Class: Cephalopoda
- Subclass: Nautiloidea
- Order: Nautilida
- Family: †Liroceratidae
- Genus: †Indonautilus; Mojsisovics, 1902

Genus of molluscs

Indonautilus is an involute nautilid from the Middle and Upper Triassic. (Anisian-Norian), with a small or occluded umbilicus and subrectangular whorl section belonging to the Liroceratidae (Clydonaulilaceae). Flanks are slightly bowed, converging on a flattened venter. Ventro-lateral shoulders are narrowly rounded or angular. Umbilical shoulder are broadly rounded. The siphuncle is subdorsal.

Indonautilus has been found in Egypt, Israel, the Himalayas, and East Indies.
