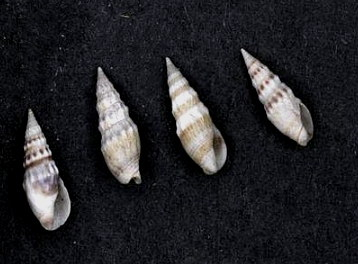
- Mazatlania cosentini

Scientific classification
- Kingdom: Animalia
- Phylum: Mollusca
- Class: Gastropoda
- Subclass: Caenogastropoda
- Order: Neogastropoda
- Superfamily: Buccinoidea
- Family: Columbellidae
- Genus: Mazatlania; Dall, 1900

Type species
- Buccinum aciculatum Lamarck, 1822

Synonyms
- Acus (Euryta) H. Adams & A. Adams, 1853 (original rank); Euryta H. Adams & A. Adams, 1853 (Invalid: junior homonym of Euryta Gistl, 1848 [Cnidaria]; Mazatlania is a replacement name); Terebra (Euryta) H. Adams & A. Adams, 1853

= Mazatlania =

Genus of gastropods

Mazatlania is a genus of sea snails, marine gastropod mollusks in the family Columbellidae, the dove snails.

== Species ==
Species within the genus Mazatlania include:

- Mazatlania cosentini (Philippi, 1836)
- Mazatlania fulgurata (Philippi, 1846)

Species brought into synonymy

- Mazatlania aciculata (Lamarck, 1822): synonym of Mazatlania cosentini (Philippi, 1836)
- Mazatlania hesperia Pilsbry & Lowe, 1932: synonym of Mazatlania fulgurata (Philippi, 1846)
