= Heteroceras =

Heteroceras Temporal range: Barremian–Aptian
- Fossil of Heteroceras emericianus (right)

Scientific classification
- Kingdom: Animalia
- Phylum: Mollusca
- Class: Cephalopoda
- Subclass: †Ammonoidea
- Order: †Ammonitida
- Suborder: †Ancyloceratina
- Family: †Heteroceratidae
- Genus: †Heteroceras d'Orbigny, 1849

Extinct genus of ammonite

Heteroceras is a genus of Lower Cretaceous heteromorph ammonites belonging to the ancyloceratoidean family, Heteroceratidae.

== Description ==
It is characterized by a helically coiled juvenile shell at the apex followed by slightly curved adult shaft, with a J-shaped section at the end of it. The shell is ribbed; ribs are concave and oblique on the helix, straight and transverse on the later stages.

== Distribution ==
Heteroceras has been found in Argentina, Bulgaria, Colombia (La Guajira), the Czech Republic, France, Italy, Japan, Madagascar, Serbia and Montenegro, South Africa, Spain, Russia and the United States (Kansas, Wyoming). Related genera are Hemibaculites and Cochidites. The family, Heteroceratidae, is a derivative of the Ancyloceratidae.
