= Entogonitidae =

Scientific classification
- Kingdom: Animalia
- Phylum: Mollusca
- Class: Cephalopoda
- Subclass: †Ammonoidea
- Order: †Goniatitida
- Superfamily: †Nomismoceratoidea
- Family: †Entogonitidae; Ruzhencev & Bogoslovskaya 1971

Genera
- Entogonites; Ubites

Extinct family of molluscs

Entogonitidae is one of two families of the Nomismoceratoidea superfamily. They are an extinct group of ammonoid, which are shelled cephalopods related to squids, belemnites, octopuses, and cuttlefish, and more distantly to the nautiloids.
