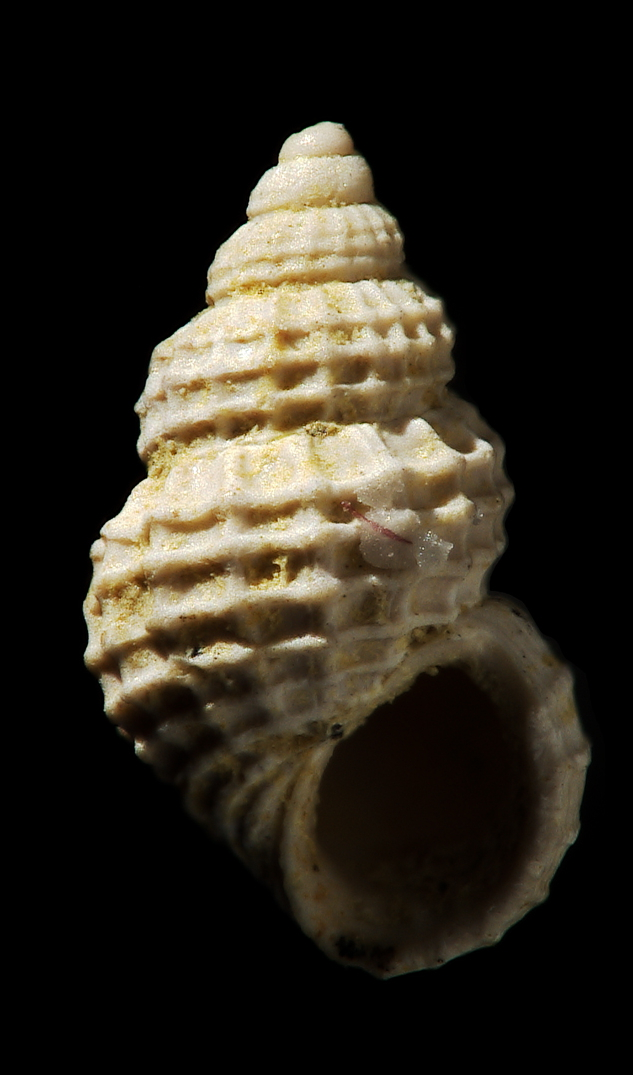
- Shell of Alvania zbyszewskii (holotype at MNHN, Paris)

Scientific classification
- Kingdom: Animalia
- Phylum: Mollusca
- Class: Gastropoda
- Subclass: Caenogastropoda
- Order: Littorinimorpha
- Superfamily: Rissooidea
- Family: Rissoidae
- Genus: Alvania
- Species: †A. zbyszewskii

Binomial name
- †Alvania zbyszewskii Van Dingenen, Ceulemans & Landau, 2016

= Alvania zbyszewskii =

Species of gastropod

Alvania zbyszewskii is an extinct species of minute sea snail, a marine gastropod mollusc or micromollusk in the family Rissoidae.

== Distribution ==
Fossils of this species were in the Lower Pliocene strata in the Loire-Atlantique, France.
