= Elmira (gastropod) =

Elmira Temporal range: Cretaceous-Eocene

Scientific classification
- Kingdom: Animalia
- Phylum: Mollusca
- Class: Gastropoda
- Order: incertae sedis
- Family: unclear
- Genus: Elmira Cooke, 1919

Genus of gastropods

Elmira is a genus of prehistoric snails, gastropod molluscs.

== Taxonomy ==
Cooke placed the Elmira within the family Viviparidae, but according to the shell features it can placed within Littorinidae, Capulidae or clade Neomphalina.

== Species ==
Species within the genus Elmira include:

- Elmira cornuatietis Cooke, 1919
- Elmira shimantoensis Kiel & Nobuhara in Nobuhara et al., 2016

The width of the shell of Elmira cornuatietis is more than 40 mm. The shape of the shell is low turbiniform. The sculpture is crossed lamellar. It has no pores in the shell.
