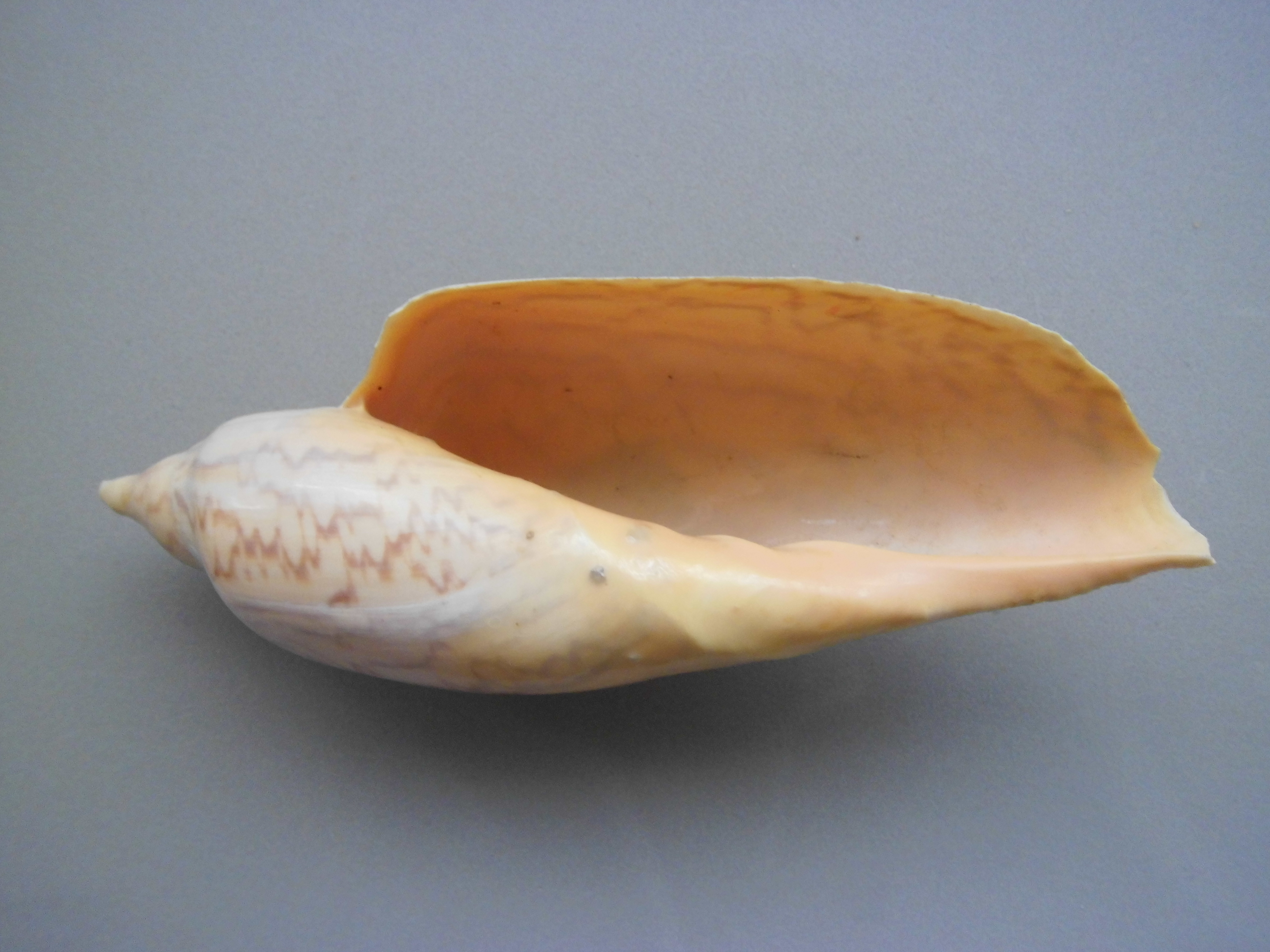
- Zidona dufresnei shell

Scientific classification
- Kingdom: Animalia
- Phylum: Mollusca
- Class: Gastropoda
- Subclass: Caenogastropoda
- Order: Neogastropoda
- Superfamily: Volutoidea
- Family: Volutidae
- Genus: Zidona; H. Adams & A. Adams, 1853

Type species
- Voluta angulata Swainson, 1821

Synonyms
- Voluta (Volutella) d'Orbigny, 1841 (Invalid: junior homonym of Volutella Perry, 1810 [Gastropoda, Vasidae] and Volutella Swainson,1829 [Marginellidae]; Zidona is a replacement name)

= Zidona =

Genus of gastropods

Zidona is a genus of sea snails, marine gastropod mollusks in the family Volutidae.

== Species ==
Species within the genus Zidona include:

- Zidona dufresnei (Donovan, 1823)

Synonyms

- Zidona (Ericusa) H. Adams & A. Adams, 1858: synonym of Ericusa H. Adams & A. Adams, 1858 (original rank)
- Zidona palliata Kaiser, 1977: synonym of Provocator palliatus (Kaiser, 1977) (basionym)
