= Tirnovella =

Tirnovella Temporal range: 142.0–136 Ma

Scientific classification
- Kingdom: Animalia
- Phylum: Mollusca
- Class: Cephalopoda
- Subclass: †Ammonoidea
- Order: †Ammonitida
- Family: †Neocomitidae
- Subfamily: †Berriasellinae
- Subgenus: †Tirnovella; Nikolov, 1966

Type species
- †Tirnovella alpillensis Mazenot, 1939

Species
- See text

Extinct subgenus of cephalopods

Tirnovella is an extinct subgenus of ammonoid cephalopod, from the early Cretaceous.

== Use in Stratigraphy ==
The group is often used as an index fossil, with Tirnovella alpillensis being used to define border between the Berriasian and the Valanginian stages of the Cretaceous, and Tirnovella subalpina defining the border between the Middle and Lower substages of the Berriasian. The Middle Berriasian is the defined as the Tirnovella occitanica zone.

== Distribution ==
Fossils of the genus are relatively common throughout Europe, with fossils from Morocco to Crimea.

== Species ==
- Tirnovella alpillensis Mazenot, 1939
- Tirnovella berriasensis Hegarat, 1964
- Tirnovella petransiens (G. Sayn, 1901)
- Tirnovella subalpina
- Tirnovella allobrogensis (Mazenot, 1939)
- Tirnovella bogdanovae (Hoedemaeker, 2016)
- Tirnovella companyi (Hoedemaeker, 2016)
- Tirnovella occitancia
