= Pithodeidae =

Scientific classification
- Kingdom: Animalia
- Phylum: Mollusca
- Class: Gastropoda
- Subclass: Caenogastropoda
- Order: incertae sedis
- Superfamily: †Paleostyloidea
- Family: †Pithodeidae; Wenz, 1938

Extinct family of gastropods

Pithodeidae is an extinct taxonomic family of fossil sea snails, marine gastropod mollusks in the clade Caenogastropoda.
