= Goniasmatidae =

Scientific classification
- Kingdom: Animalia
- Phylum: Mollusca
- Class: Gastropoda
- Subclass: Caenogastropoda
- Order: incertae sedis
- Superfamily: †Paleostyloidea
- Family: †Goniasmatidae; Nützel & Bandel, 2000

Extinct family of gastropods

Goniasmatidae is an extinct family of fossil sea snails, marine gastropod molluscs in the clade Caenogastropoda.

Genera:

- Akasakiella Nützel, 2012
- Cerithioides Haughton, 18592
- Cerithiozone Nützel, 20122
- Cheilotomona Strand, 19282
- Cochlearia K. F. Braun, 18412
- Cordispira X.-D. Qiao, 19832
- Costataenia Nützel, 20122
- Donaldospira Batten, 19662
- Erwinispira Nützel & H.-Z. Pan, 20052
- Laschmaspira Mazaev, 20032
- Murchisonietta Nützel, Kaim & Grădinaru, 20182
- Platyzona Knight, 19452
- Pseudomurchisonia Koken, 18962
- Stegocoelia J. Donald, 18892
- Trypanocochlea Tomlin, 19312
- Verania Koken, 18962
- Vistilia Koken, 18962
