= Raphitoma grimmertingenensis =

Scientific classification
- Kingdom: Animalia
- Phylum: Mollusca
- Class: Gastropoda
- Subclass: Caenogastropoda
- Order: Neogastropoda
- Superfamily: Conoidea
- Family: Raphitomidae
- Genus: Raphitoma
- Species: R. grimmertingenensis

Binomial name
- Raphitoma grimmertingenensis R. Marquet, Lenaerts & Laporte, 2016

Extinct species of gastropod

Raphitoma grimmertingenensis is an extinct species of sea snail, a marine gastropod mollusc in the family Raphitomidae.

== Distribution ==
Fossils of this extinct marine species were found in Early Oligocene strata in Belgium
