= Ariyalur Group =

Geological group in Southern India

Ariyalaur Group
- Stratigraphic range: Late Cretaceous to Palaeogene (Paleocene) (Campanian to Danian); ~82–65.5 Ma
- Type: Geological group
- Sub-units: Sillakkudi formation, Kallakurichi Formation, Ottakovil formation, Kallamedu Formation
- Underlies: Niniyur Formation
- Overlies: Anaipadi Formation, Trichinopoly Group

Location
- Country: India
- Ariyalur Group (India) Ariyalur Group (Tamil Nadu)

The Ariyalaur Group is a geological group in Tamil Nadu in Southern India.

== Fossil content ==
Color key: Taxon / Reclassified taxon / Taxon falsely reported as present / Dubious taxon or junior synonym / Ichnotaxon / Ootaxon / Morphotaxon	Notes; Uncertain or tentative taxa are in small text; ~~crossed out~~ taxa are discredited.

Dinosaurs from the Ariyalaur group
Genus	Species	Material	Notes	Member	Images
Abelisauridae indet.		"Disassociated remains" and teeth.		Kallamedu formation	
Carnosauria indet.?		"Fragmentary remains".	Carnosauria was often used as a wastebasket taxon.	Kallamedu formation	
Troodontidae indet.		One isolated tooth (DUGF/52).		Kallamedu formation	
Bruhathkayosaurus	B. matleyi	ilium and ischium, femur, tibia, radius and part of a vertebra (specifically a platycoelous caudal centrum). Remains no longer exist.	Initially described as a Theropod, it was reclassified as a Titanosaur.	Kallamedu formation	
Sauropoda	Indeterminate.	"Fragmentary remains".		Kallamedu formation	
Titanosauria	Indeterminate.	Solitary egg.		Kallamedu formation	
Titanosauria	Indeterminate.	Ten large sauropod bones, some of which could be identified as a humerus or femur, proximal end of a femur and scapula. All the bones pertain to the limbs.	Similar in size to Bruhathkayosaurus.	Kallamedu formation	
Fusioolithus	F. baghensis	Dinosaur eggs.		Kallamedu formation	
?Camarasauridae	Indeterminate.	Vertebrae.	Camarasaurids are not known from the cretaceous.	Kallamedu formation	
?Stegosauria	Indeterminate.	Misinterpreted sauropod bone.	Other more plausible Stegosaur material is known from Cretaceous India.	Kallamedu formation	
Sauropoda	Sauropoda indet.		"Scant remains".		
Stegosauria	Stegosauria indet.				
Theropoda	Theropoda indet.		"Scant remains".		
Theropoda	indet.		A Theropod.	Kallankurichchi formation	
?Titanosaurus	T. indicus		A dubious genus of titanosaurian sauropod.	Kallakurichi Formation	Titanosaurus
Megaloolithus	M. cylindricus	Fossilised eggs.	A Sauropod Oogenus.	Kallakurichi Formation	Sanajeh fossil The holotype of Sanajeh preserved with Megaloolithus
Stegosauridae	Stegosauridae indet			A Stegosaurid.	Kallakurichi Formation

Molluscs from the Ariyalaur group
Genus	Species	Material	Notes	Member	Images
Inoceramus	I. sp.			Sillakkudi formation	
Karapadites	K. karapadense			Sillakkudi formation	
Inoceramus	I. bulbus		A clam.	Kallakurichi formation	
Inoceramus	I. tamulicus		A clam.	Kallakurichi formation	
Pycnodonta	P. vesicularis		A clam.	Kallakurichi formation	
Ostrea (Alectryonia)	sp.		A clam.	Kallakurichi formation	
Anisomyon	A. indicus		A snail.	Kallakurichi formation	

Foraminiferas from the Ariyalaur group
Genus		Species	Material	Notes	Images
Globotruncana	G. arca			Sillakkudi formation	
Globotruncana	G. ventricosa			Sillakkudi formation	
Globotruncana	G. elevata			Sillakkudi formation	

Sea Urchins from the Ariyalaur group
Genus	Species	Material	Member	Notes	Images
Hemipneustes	H. compressus		Kallakurichi Formation		

Rhynchonellatans from the Ariyalaur group
Genus	Species	Material	Notes	Member	Images
Rectithyris	R. subdepressa			Kallakurichi Formation	
Rhynchonella	R. sp.			Kallakurichi Formation	

Brachiopods from the Ariyalaur group
Genus	Species	Material	Notes	Member	Images
Gyrodina	G. globosa			Kallakurichi Formation	
Neobulimina	N. sp.			Kallakurichi Formation	

Arthropods from the Ariyalur group
Genus	Species	Material	Notes	Member	Images
Thalassinoides	T. sp.		An ichnofossil made by decapod crustaceans, or fish	Ottakovil Formation	
Ophiomorpha	O. sp.		Made by burrowing arthropods	Ottakovil Formation	
