= Sillakkudi Formation =

Geologic formation in Tamil Nadu, India

Sillakkudi formation
- Stratigraphic range: Early Campanian; ~82–78 Ma
- Type: Geological formation
- Unit of: Ariyalur Group
- Underlies: Kallakurichi Formation
- Overlies: Anaipadi Formation

Lithology
- Primary: Sandstone

Location
- Location: Sillakkudi
- Region: Tamil Nadu
- Country: India

Type section
- Coordinates: 11°05′50″N 79°02′15″E
- Sillakkudi Formation (India) Sillakkudi Formation (Tamil Nadu)

The Sillakkudi Formation is a Late Cretaceous (Campanian) geological formation located in Tamil Nadu, India it forms part of the Ariyalur Group. It dates to the Campanian of the Late Cretaceous.

== Description ==
The formation was deposited in a Shallow Marine setting as it shows signs of a mobile deposition of substrate. The diversity of the Mollusc fauna of the formation also indicates a shallow marine deposition.

== Fossil content ==
Lamellibranchs and echinoid fragments have been reported from the Sillakkudi formation.

Molluscs from the Sillakkurdi formation
Genus	Species	Material	Notes	Member
Inoceramus	I. sp.			
Karapadites	K. karapadense			

Foraminiferas from the Sillakkudi formation
Genus		Species	Material	Notes	Member
Globotruncana	G. arca				
Globotruncana	G. ventricosa				
Globotruncana	G. elevata				
