= Fournierella =

Fournierella is the scientific name of two genera of organisms and may refer to:

- Fournierella (bacterium), a genus of bacteria in the family Oscillospiraceae
- Fournierella (cephalopod), a genus of ammonites
