= Trichinopoly Group =

Geological formation in India

- Stratigraphic range: Turonian-Santonian; ~94–84 Ma
- Type: Geological formation
- Sub-units: Anaipadi Formation
- Underlies: Ariyalur Group
- Overlies: Ootatoor Group

Lithology
- Primary: Sandstone

Location
- Coordinates: 11.1°N 78.9°E
- Approximate paleocoordinates: 44.8°S 45.8°E
- Region: Tamil Nadu and Kerala
- Country: India
- Trichinopoly Group (India)

The Trichinopoly Group is a geological formation in India whose strata date back to the Late Cretaceous. It lies between the Ootatoor and Ariyalur Groups. It is broad in its southern extremity but thins as it gradually proceeds northwards as it ultimately meets the Ariyalur Group. Dinosaur remains are among the fossils that have been recovered from the formation.

== Paleobiota ==
Color key: Taxon / Reclassified taxon / Taxon falsely reported as present / Dubious taxon or junior synonym / Ichnotaxon / Ootaxon / Morphotaxon	Notes; Uncertain or tentative taxa are in small text; ~~crossed out~~ taxa are discredited.

=== Dinosaurs ===
Ornithischians

Genus	Species	Location	Stratigraphic position	Material	Notes	Images
Dravidosaurus	D. blanfordi	Ariyalur	Anaipadi formation	Fragmentary Skull, tooth, sacrum, ilium, ischium, armor plate and dermal spine of an adult.	A (Possible) Stegosaur.	
?Iguanodon	sp.	Ootatoor		"Unidentified remains of a Gigantic Saurian presumed to be an Ornithopod"	A fragmentary Ornithopod described as an Iguanodon.	

== See also ==
- List of dinosaur-bearing rock formations
