= Ottakovil Formation =

Geological formation in Tamil Nadu, India

Ottakovil formation
- Stratigraphic range: Middle Maastrichtian; ~69.72–66.65 Ma
- Type: Geological formation
- Unit of: Ariyalur Group
- Underlies: Kallamedu Formation
- Overlies: Kallakurichi Formation

Location
- Location: Ottakovil
- Ottakovil Formation (India) Ottakovil Formation (Tamil Nadu)

The Ottakovil formation (Also spelled Ottakoil) is a geological formation in the state of Tamil Nadu, India.

== Description ==
The formation was a shallow marine environment with fossils of Echinoids, Nautilus, Ammonites, Alectronia as well as calcareous nannoplankton.

== Fossil Content ==
Fossils of echinoids, nautiluses, ammonites, the oyster Alectronia, and calcareous nannoplankton have been reported from the formation.

Color key: Taxon / Reclassified taxon / Taxon falsely reported as present / Dubious taxon or junior synonym / Ichnotaxon / Ootaxon / Morphotaxon	Notes; Uncertain or tentative taxa are in small text; ~~crossed out~~ taxa are discredited.

Ichnofossils from the Ottakovil formation
Genus	Species	Material	Notes	Member
Thalassinoides	T. sp.		An ichnofossil made by decapod crustaceans, or fish	
Ophiomorpha	O. sp.			
