= List of biostratigraphic zones of Japan =

List of Japanese biostratigraphic zones

This list is of the biostratigraphic zones of Japan. The determinant Cretaceous "indices" being local species of Inoceramidae and Desmoceratoidea, the schema also differs from that of other regions.

== Cretaceous ==
Japanese time scale		ICS	
Japanese time scale		Stage / Age	System / Period
Miyakoan (宮古統)	Lower Miyakoan (宮古統下部階)	Aptian	Lower Cretaceous
Miyakoan (宮古統)	Upper Miyakoan (宮古統上部階)	Albian	Lower Cretaceous
Miyakoan (宮古統)	Infragyliakian	Cenomanian	Upper Cretaceous
Gyliakian (ギリヤーク統)	Lower Gyliakian (ギリヤーク統下部階)	Cenomanian	Upper Cretaceous
Gyliakian (ギリヤーク統)	Upper Gyliakian (ギリヤーク統上部階)	Turonian	Upper Cretaceous
Urakawan (浦河統)	Lower Urakawan (浦河統下部階)	Coniacian	Upper Cretaceous
Urakawan (浦河統)	Upper Urakawan (浦河統上部階)	Santonian	Upper Cretaceous
Urakawan (浦河統)	Infrahetonaian	Campanian	Upper Cretaceous
Hetonaian (ヘトナイ統)	Lower Hetonaian (ヘトナイ統下部階)	Campanian	Upper Cretaceous
Hetonaian (ヘトナイ統)	Upper Hetonaian (ヘトナイ統上部階)	Maastrichtian	Upper Cretaceous

== Palaeogene and Neogene ==
Palaeogene and Neogene stages in western Japan include (from the Middle Eocene to the Early Miocene):

- Takashiman (高島階)
- Okinoshiman (沖ノ島階)
- Funazuan (船津昔)
- Mazean (間瀬昔)
- Nishisonogian (西彼杵昔)
- Saseboan (佐世保階)

Other Neogene stages include:

- Haranoyan (原谷階)
- Tozawan (戸沢階)
- Kaburan (カブラ階)
- Fujian (富士階)
- Yuian (由比階)
- Totomian (遠江階)
- Suchian (周智階)
- Kechienjian (結縁寺階)
- Yuzanjian (湯山寺階)
