= Kallakurichi Formation =

Maastrichtian geologic formation in India

- Stratigraphic range: Maastrichtian; ~72–69 Ma
- Type: Geological formation
- Unit of: Ariyalur Group
- Underlies: Ottakovil formation
- Overlies: Sillakkudi formation

Lithology
- Primary: Limestone

Location
- Coordinates: 11.1°N 79.1°E
- Approximate paleocoordinates: 35.3°S 56.4°E
- Region: Tamil Nadu
- Country: India

Type section
- Named for: Kallakurichi
- Kallakurichi Formation (India) Kallakurichi Formation (Tamil Nadu)

The Kallakurichi Formation, alternatively spelled as Kallankurichchi or Kallankurichi Formation, is a geological formation of the Ariyalur Group in Tamil Nadu, southern India whose strata date back to the Maastrichtian stage of the Late Cretaceous. Dinosaur eggs of Megaloolithus cylindricus are among the fossils that have been recovered from the sandy limestones of the formation.

== Fossil content ==
The following fossils were reported from the formation:

Color key: Taxon / Reclassified taxon / Taxon falsely reported as present / Dubious taxon or junior synonym / Ichnotaxon / Ootaxon / Morphotaxon	Notes; Uncertain or tentative taxa are in small text; ~~crossed out~~ taxa are discredited.

=== Dinosaurs ===
Ornithischian

Ornithischians from the Kallakurichi Formation
Genus	Species	Material	Notes
Stegosauridae	indet		A Stegosaurid.

Sauropods

Sauropods from the Kallakurichi Formation
Genus	Species	Material	Notes	Images
?Titanosaurus	T. indicus		A dubious titanosaurian sauropod.	
Megaloolithus	M. cylindricus	Fossilised Eggs	A Sauropod Oogenus.	Megaloolithus eggs from France

Theropods

Theropods from the Kallakurichi Formation
Genus	Species	Material	Notes
Theropoda	indet		A Theropod.

=== Molluscas ===
Molluscas from the Kallakurichi Formation
Genus	Species	Material	Notes
Inoceramus	I. bulbus		A Clam.
Inoceramus	I. tamulicus		A Clam.
Pycnodonta	P. vesicularis		A Clam.
Ostrea (Alectryonia)	sp.		A Clam.
Anisomyon	A. indicus		A Clam.

Brachiopods from the Kallakurichi formation
Genus	Species	Material	Notes	Member
Gyrodina	G. globosa			
Isocrania	I. multicostata			
Neobulimina	N. sp.			

Foraminiferans from the Kallakurichi formation
Genus	Species	Material	Notes	Member
Textulariina	T. nacataensis			

Rhynchonellatans from the Kallakurichi formation
Genus	Species	Material	Notes	Member
Rectithyris	R. subdepressa			
Rhynchonella	R. sp.			

Sea Urchins from the Kallakurichi formation
Genus	Species	Material	Notes	Member
Hemipneustes	H. compressus		A holasterid sea urchin	

== See also ==
- List of dinosaur-bearing rock formations
  - List of stratigraphic units with dinosaur trace fossils
    - Dinosaur eggs
