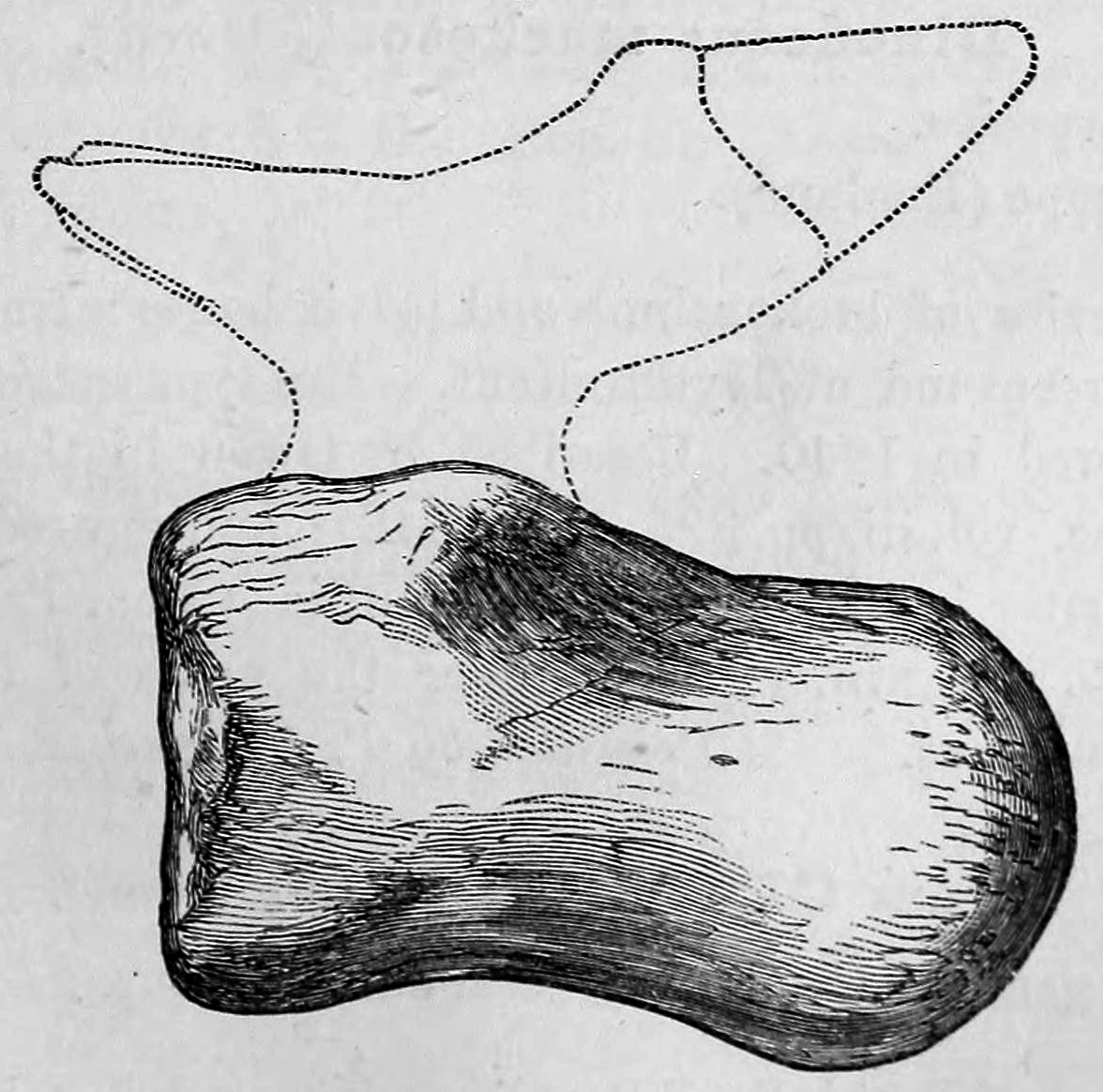
- Lectotype caudal vertebra of I. valdensis

Scientific classification
- Kingdom: Animalia
- Phylum: Chordata
- Class: Reptilia
- Clade: Dinosauria
- Clade: Saurischia
- Clade: †Sauropodomorpha
- Clade: †Sauropoda
- Clade: †Macronaria
- Clade: †Titanosauria
- Genus: †Iuticosaurus le Loeuff e.a., 1993

Type species
- †Titanosaurus valdensis (von Huene, 1929)

Species
- †I. lydekkeri (von Huene, 1929), nomen dubium; †I. valdensis (von Huene, 1929)

Synonyms
- Titanosaurus lydekkeri von Huene, 1929; Titanosaurus valdensis von Huene, 1929

= Iuticosaurus =

Iuticosaurus Temporal range: Early Cretaceous to Late Cretaceous, 145–94 Ma

Extinct genus of dinosaurs

Iuticosaurus (meaning "Jute lizard") is a genus of titanosaur sauropod dinosaur from the Early Cretaceous of the Isle of Wight. Two species have been named: I. valdensis and I. lydekkeri. I. valdensis was found in the Wessex Formation and I. lydekkeri in the younger Upper Greensand.

== History and taxonomy ==
In 1887 Richard Lydekker described two sauropod tail vertebrae found by William Fox near Brook Bay on Wight, BMNH R146a and BMNH 151, and referred them to the genus Ornithopsis, despite indicating their similarity to Titanosaurus (noting them once as Titanosaurus species A and Titanosaurus species B), because the tail of Ornithopsis was unknown. On reading the paper to the Geological Society of London, Lydekker was criticised by Harry Govier Seeley and John Hulke for his choice and in 1888 he referred to the fossils as Titanosaurus sp. a, Titanosaurus sp. b being a third vertebra, BMNH 32390.

In 1929 Friedrich von Huene named both taxa as full species. The first became Titanosaurus Valdensis, the specific name referring to the Wealden, the second Titanosaurus Lydekkeri, its specific name honouring Lydekker. By present convention both specific names would be spelled as T. valdensis and T. lydekkeri respectively.

In 1993 Jean le Loeuff redescribed the material and named a separate genus: Iuticosaurus, the generic name referring to the Jutes who settled the island in the fifth century and established a Jute dynasty in the sixth century. Le Loeuff made Iuticosaurus valdensis the type species, and chose BMNH 151 as the lectotype. Another vertebra, BMNH R 1886, was referred by him to this species. The second species, though formally named by him as Iuticosaurus lydekkeri, he considered a nomen dubium.

== Description ==
Iuticosaurus was probably similar to the dubious Titanosaurus. It measured 15 to 20 metres (49–65 feet) long.

== Classification ==
Most researchers have concluded that both species of Iuticosaurus cannot be distinguished from other titanosaurs and are therefore nomina dubia. It was, however, probably a titanosaur.
