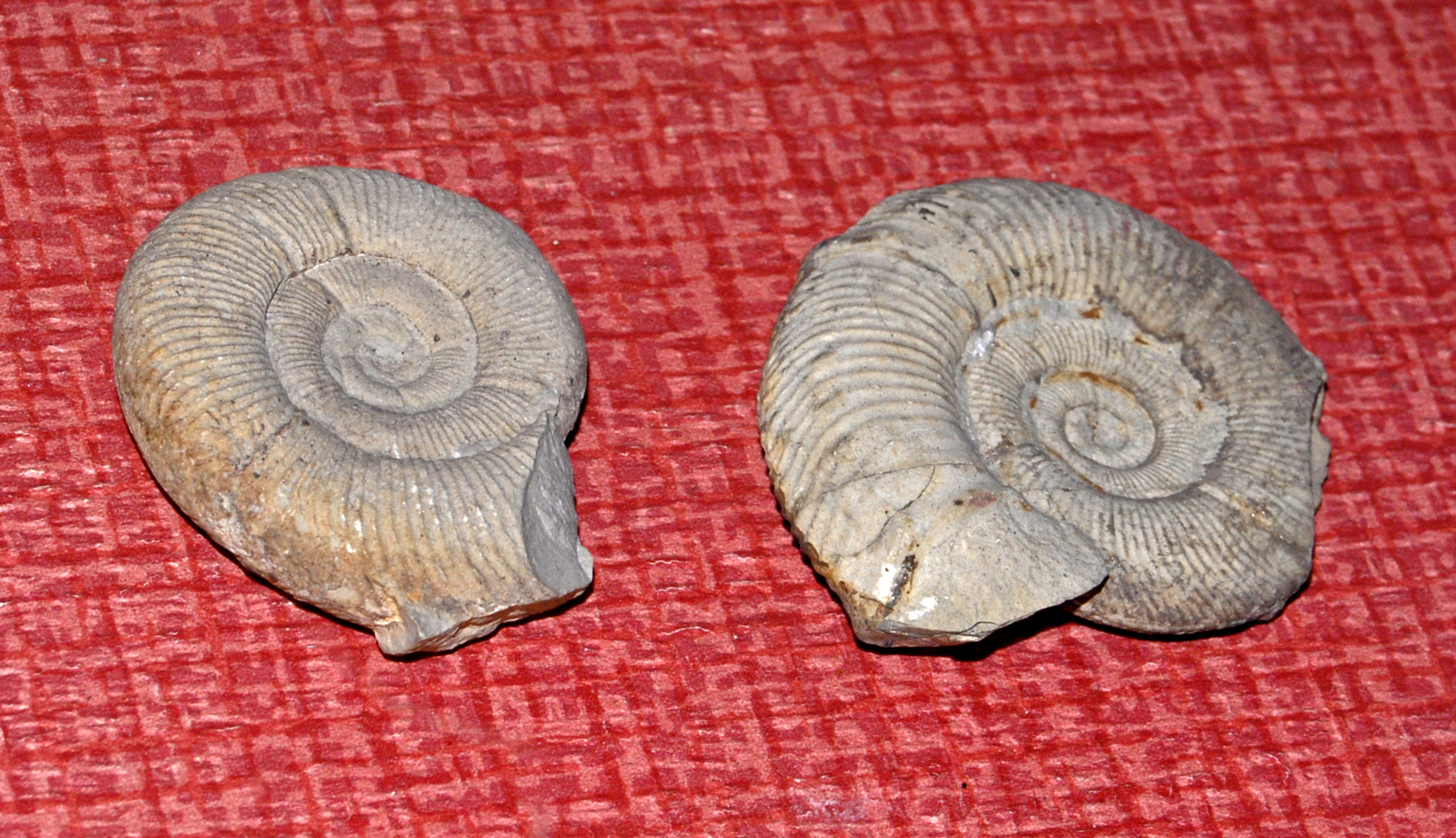
- Silesites seranonis from Alpes-de-Haute-Provence

Scientific classification
- Kingdom: Animalia
- Phylum: Mollusca
- Class: Cephalopoda
- Subclass: †Ammonoidea
- Order: †Ammonitida
- Superfamily: †Desmoceratoidea
- Family: †Silesitidae; Hyatt, 1900

Taxonomy
- Neoastieria; Piatnitzkyceras; Silesites; Silesitoidinae

= Silesitidae =

Silesitidae Temporal range: Barremian

Extinct family of ammonites

Silesitidae is an ammonite family in the superfamily Desmoceratoidea. They lived during the Cretaceous, in the Barremian age.

== Taxonomy ==
- Neoastieria
- Piatnitzkyceras
- Silesites
- Silesitoidinae

== Distribution ==
Fossils of species within this genus have been found in the Cretaceous sediments of Antarctica, France, Hungary, Italy, Mexico, Morocco, Slovakia, Spain.
