= Fournierella (cephalopod) =

Fournierella Temporal range: Santonian

Scientific classification
- Kingdom: Animalia
- Phylum: Mollusca
- Class: Cephalopoda
- Subclass: †Ammonoidea
- Order: †Ammonitida
- Family: †Muniericeratidae
- Genus: †Fournierella; Collignon, 1966

Fournierella is a member of the Muniericeratidae, a family of Upper Cretaceous ammonites characterized by moderately evolute shells with strong sinuous ribs that have tubercles on the shoulders and umbilical edge, and a more or less fastigate cross section (venter sloping on either side like a gable roof), included in the Desmocerataceae. It may be a subgenus of Pseudoschloenbachia.
