= Kallamedu Formation =

Geologic formation in India

- Stratigraphic range: Maastrichtian to Danian; ~70.6–65.5 Ma
- Type: Geological formation
- Unit of: Ariyalur Group
- Underlies: Niniyur Formation
- Overlies: Archean Basement
- Thickness: Variable, typically 5–5,000 km (3.1–3,106.9 mi)

Lithology
- Primary: Claystone, siltstone limestone
- Other: Conglomerate

Location
- Coordinates: 11.6962°N 79.4127°E
- Country: India
- Extent: Kallamedu

Type section
- Named for: Kallamedu village

The Kallamedu Formation is an Upper Cretaceous (Maastrichtian) geologic formation located in the Ariyalur district of Tamil Nadu, India that forms part of the Ariyalur Group. It dates to the Maastrichtian of the Late Cretaceous. Dinosaur remains and petrified wood samples are among the known fossils recovered from this formation.

== Lithology ==
The Kallamedu Formation likely represented a fluvial environment. It is composed of siltstones, clays and sandstones. The high organic carbon content of some of the rocks are consistent with a swamp.

== Paleofauna ==
Color key: Taxon / Reclassified taxon / Taxon falsely reported as present / Dubious taxon or junior synonym / Ichnotaxon / Ootaxon / Morphotaxon	Notes; Uncertain or tentative taxa are in small text; ~~crossed out~~ taxa are discredited.

=== Dinosaurs ===
Dinosaurs from the Kallamedu Formation
Genus	Species	Material	Notes	Images
Abelisauridae indet.	Indeterminate.	"Disassociated remains" and teeth.		
Bruhathkayosaurus	B. matleyi	ilium and ischium, femur, tibia, radius and part of a vertebra (specifically a platycoelous caudal centrum). Remains no longer exist	Initially described as a Theropod, it was reclassified as a Titanosaur.	
Carnosauria indet.?	Indeterminate.	"Fragmentary remains"	Carnosauria was often used as a wastebasket taxon.	
?Camarasauridae	Indeterminate.	Vertebrae.	Camarasaurids are not known from the Cretaceous.	
Fusioolithus	F. baghensis	Dinosaur eggs.		
Megalosaurus	M.sp.	A partial tooth, length of 1.8 inches, antero-posterior diameter of 0.9 inches and transverse diameter of 0.4 inches. The tooth is almost similar to Megalosaurus in shape and size though the posterior border is straigher.	Megalosaurus was often used as a waste basket taxon.	
Sauropoda	Indeterminate.	"Fragmentary remains."		
?Stegosauria	Indeterminate.	Misinterpreted sauropod bone.	Other more plausible Stegosaur material is known from Cretaceous India.	
Titanosauria	Indeterminate.	Solitary egg.		
Titanosauria	Indeterminate.	Ten large sauropod bones, some of which could be identified as a humerus or femur, proximal end of a femur and scapula. All the bones pertain to the limbs.	Similar in size to Bruhathkayosaurus.	
Troodontidae indet.	Indeterminate.	Two teeth (DUGF/52 and DUGF/168).	Close morphological resemblance to Troodon	

=== Crocodylomorphs ===
Crocodylomorphs from the Kallamedu Formation				
Genus	Species	Material	Notes	Images
Crocodilia	Indeterminate	Teeth.		
Simosuchus	cf.S. sp.	Teeth.	Notosuchian Related to Simosuchus.	

=== Turtles ===
Turtle from the Kallamedu Formation
Genus	Species	Material	Notes
Kurmademys	K. kallamedensis	Nearly complete skull.	A Side-necked Turtle.
Testudines	Indeterminate	Several fragmentary pieces of carapace and one vetebral element.	Too fragmentary to compare with Kurmademys.

=== Fish ===
Fish from the Kallamedu Formation
Genus	Species	Material	Notes
Lepisosteidae	Indeterminate.	Scales.	Similar scales are known from the Intertrappean Beds.

=== Amphibians ===
Amphibians from the Kallamedu Formation
Genus	Species	Material	Notes
Anura	Indeterminate.	Fragmentary ilium.	
