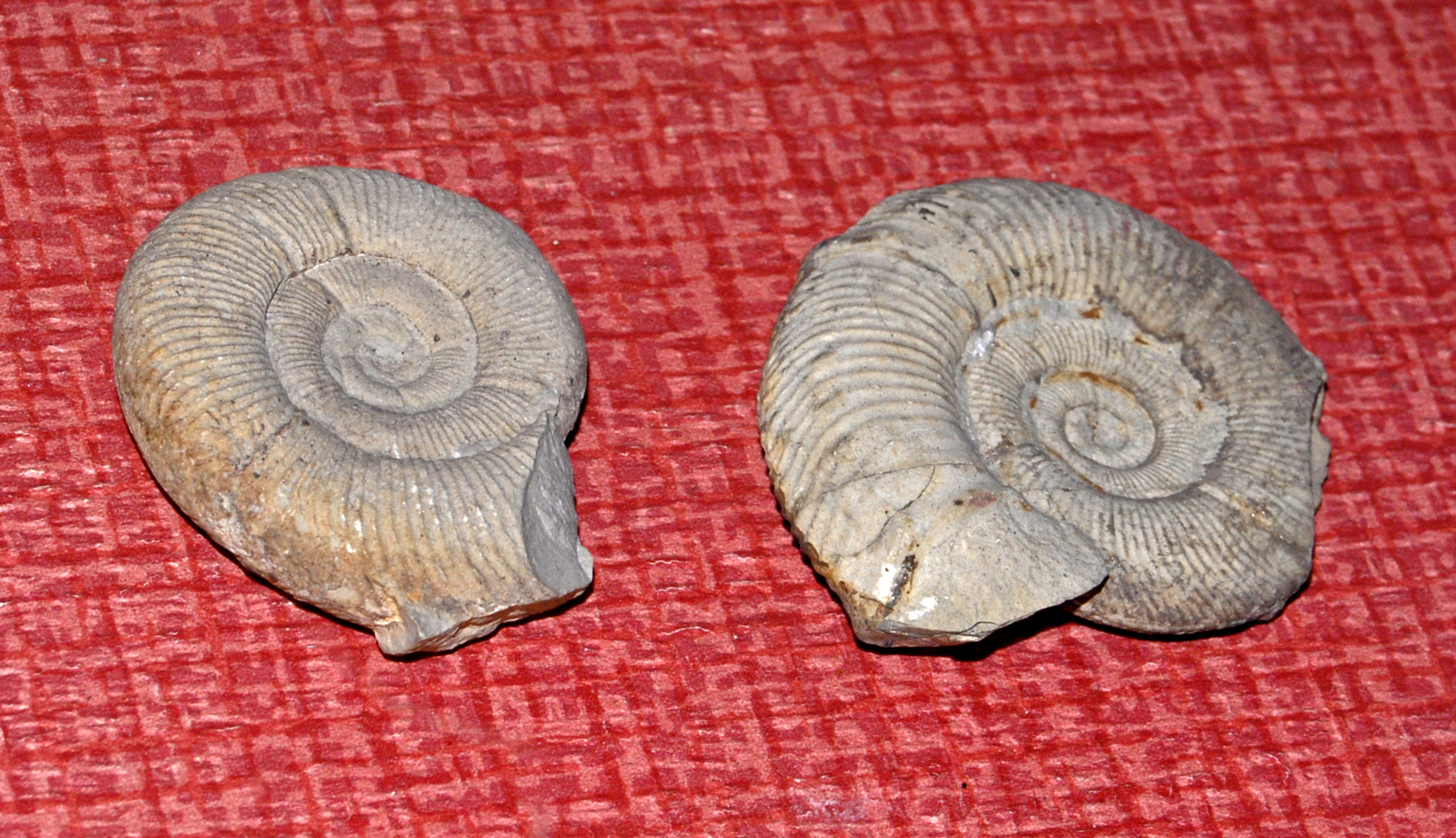
- Fossil shell of Silesites seranonis from Alpes-de-Haute-Provence, on display at Galerie de paléontologie et d'anatomie comparée in Paris

Scientific classification
- Kingdom: Animalia
- Phylum: Mollusca
- Class: Cephalopoda
- Subclass: †Ammonoidea
- Order: †Ammonitida
- Family: †Silesitidae
- Genus: †Silesites; Uhlig, 1883

= Silesites =

Silesites Temporal range: Cretaceous (Barremian age), 129.4–125.0 Ma

Genus of molluscs (fossil)

Silesites is an ammonite genus placed in the family Silesitidae. Species in this genus were fast-moving nektonic carnivores. They lived during the Cretaceous, in the Barremian age. The type species of the genus is Silesites seranonis .

== Species ==
- Silesites seranonis
- Silesites vulpes

== Distribution ==
Fossils of species within this genus have been found in the Cretaceous sediments of Antarctica, France, Hungary, Italy, Mexico, Morocco, Slovakia, Spain.

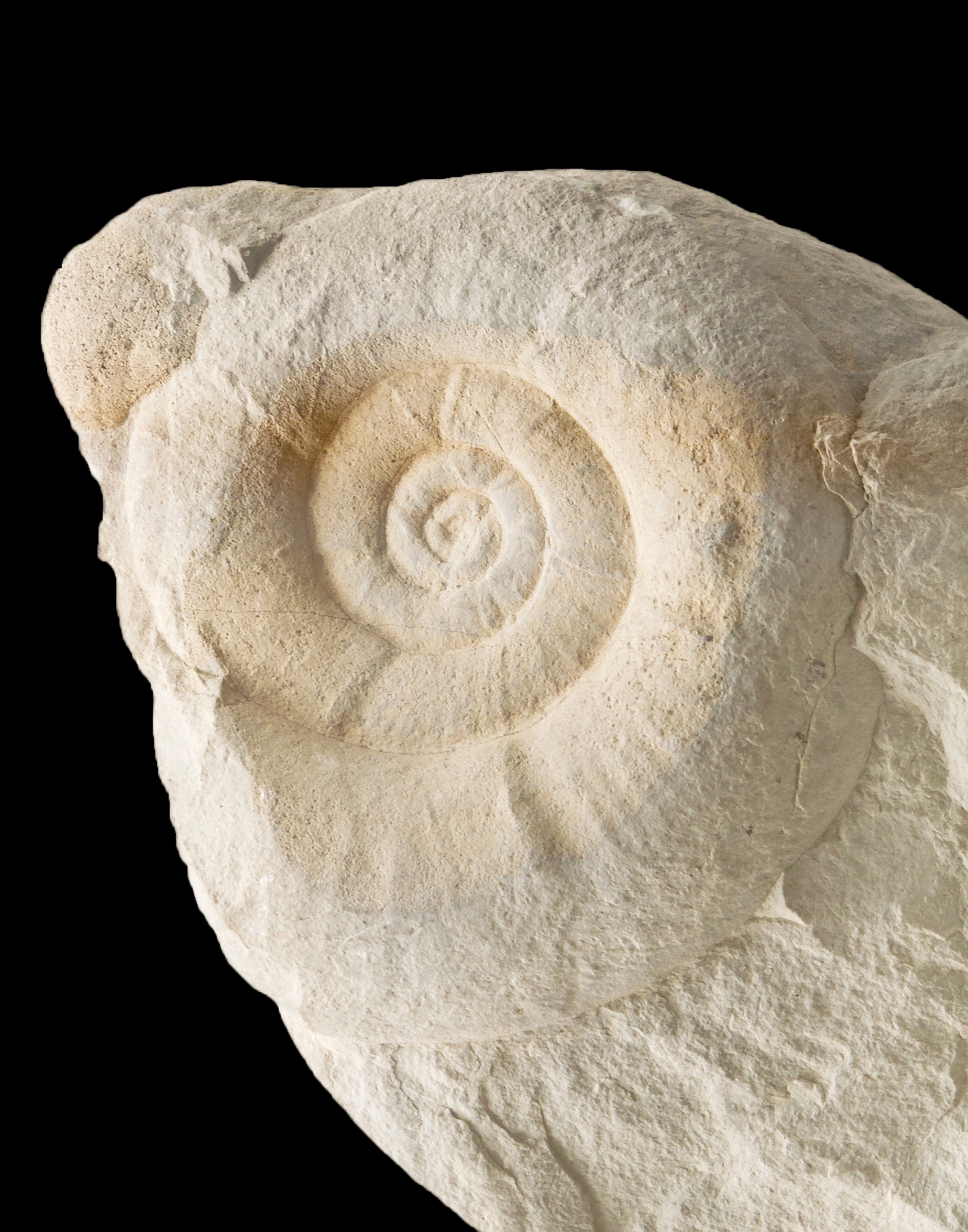
Silesites vulpes
