= Compton Bay =

Bay on the Isle of Wight, England

Coordinates: 50.662°N 1.49°W

Compton Bay on the Isle of Wight

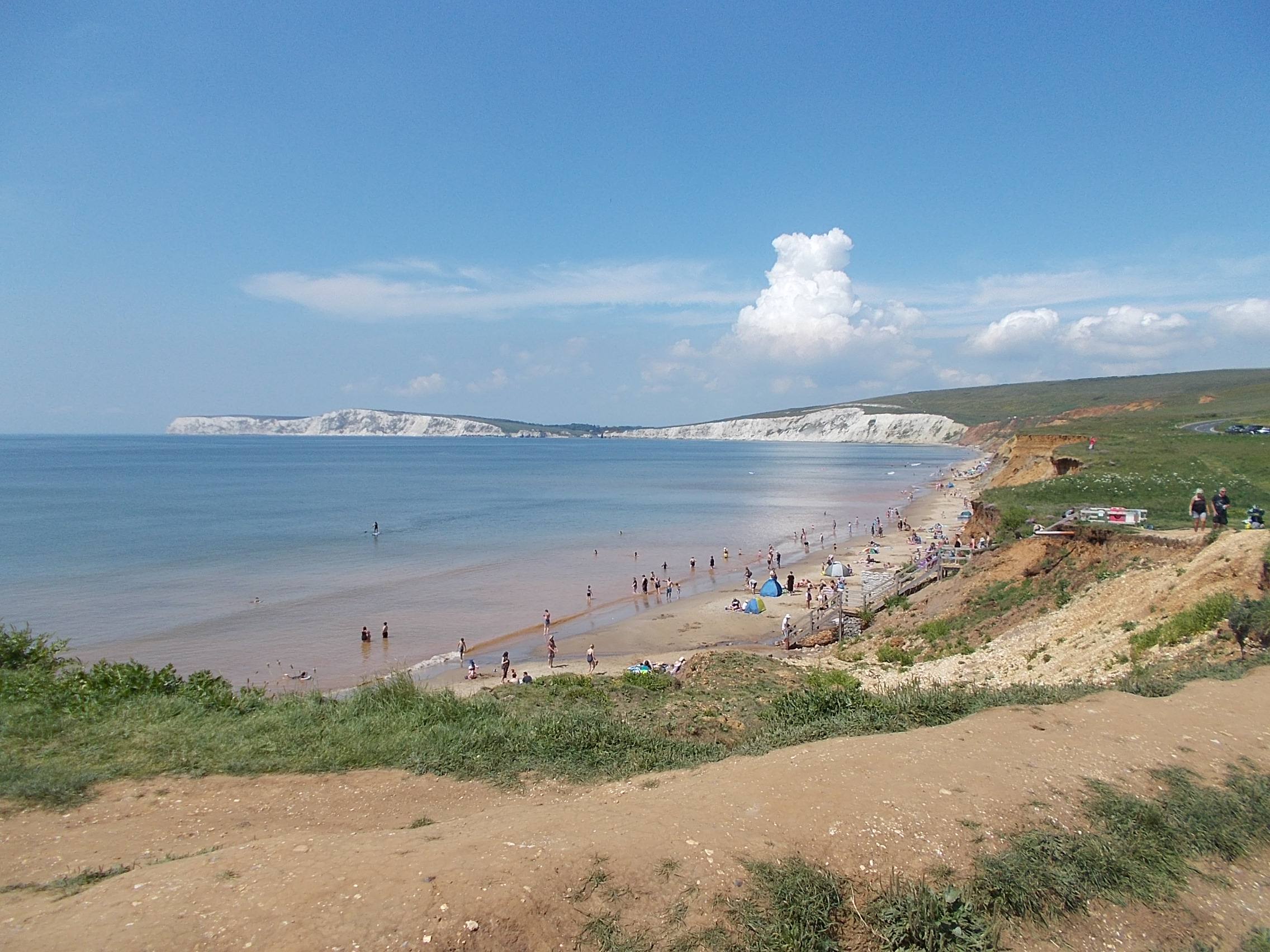
The beach at Compton Bay, looking west

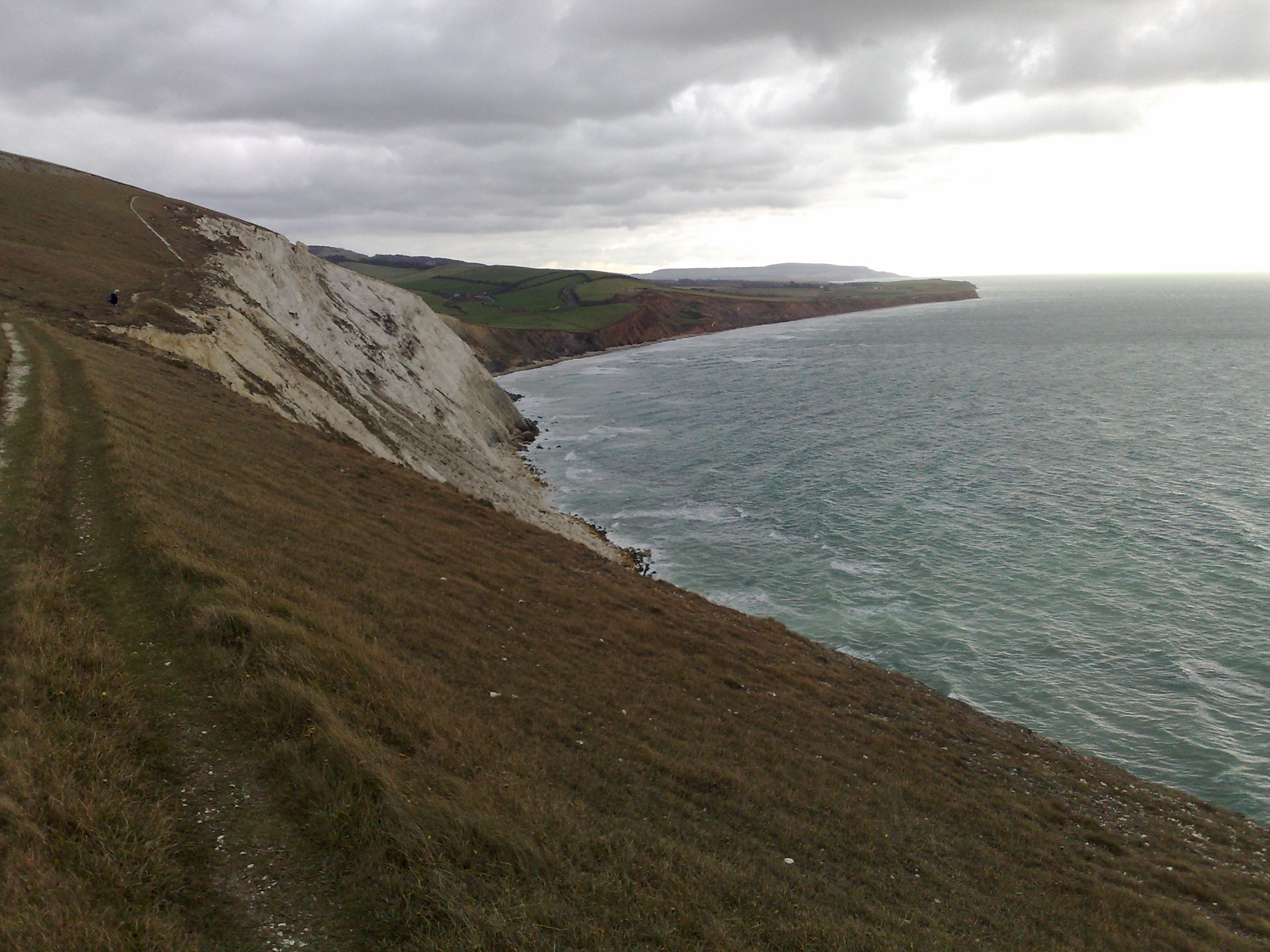
Compton Bay looking to the south east

Compton Bay is a bay located on the southwest section of the Isle of Wight, England. Its northwestern edge is defined by the distinctive white chalk cliff of Freshwater Cliff, named after adjacent Freshwater Bay, which forms a small cove with the village of Freshwater situated just behind. Its northeastern edge is formed from the soft red and orange lower cretaceous rocks of Brook Bay, which are rapidly eroding.

Due to the lack of grazing on the cliffs above the bay, the native chalk ecosystem has thrived. Atop the cliffs, the Island's county flower, the pyramidal orchid, can be found, while the rare Glanville fritillary butterfly also lives in large numbers supported by the native flowers. There are also other hardy plants, such as common gorse bushes and wild cabbage.

The bay is popular with wave and kite surfers due to the waves that form when the prevailing south-westerly wind is blowing onshore. The beach is gently shelving and consists mostly of sand, with a few lengths of submerged rock, although at high tide the sea covers the beach almost completely. The car park and its public facilities are owned by the National Trust, as is the coastal strip of land. The Isle of Wight Coastal Path runs along the cliff around the bay.

There are dinosaur footprints visible in Compton Bay when the tide is low, and this is one of the best areas to see the dinosaurs of the Isle of Wight. Fossil hunters can often be seen searching for smaller fossils on the beach. Comptonatus was found here.

Compton Bay was the subject of three songs by past West Wight resident Robyn Hitchcock: "Airscape" from the 1986 album Element of Light, "Oceanside" from the 1991 album Perspex Island, and "Time Coast" from the 2017 album Robyn Hitchcock.

== Afton Down Obelisk ==
Atop Afton Down, roughly halfway between Brook and Freshwater Bay, a small obelisk can be found overlooking the bay. It is inscribed with a memorial to a resident of one of the nearby villages who fell from the cliff to his death in 1846. This obelisk was Grade II listed in 1994.

"E.L.M. Aged 15
He cometh forth like a flower and is cut down.
He fleeth also as a shadow and continueth not.
Erected in remembrance of a most dear and only child who was suddenly removed into eternity by a fall from the adjacent cliff on the rocks below.
28th August 1846."

Each side of the obelisk is inscribed with biblical passages in relation to the afterlife.

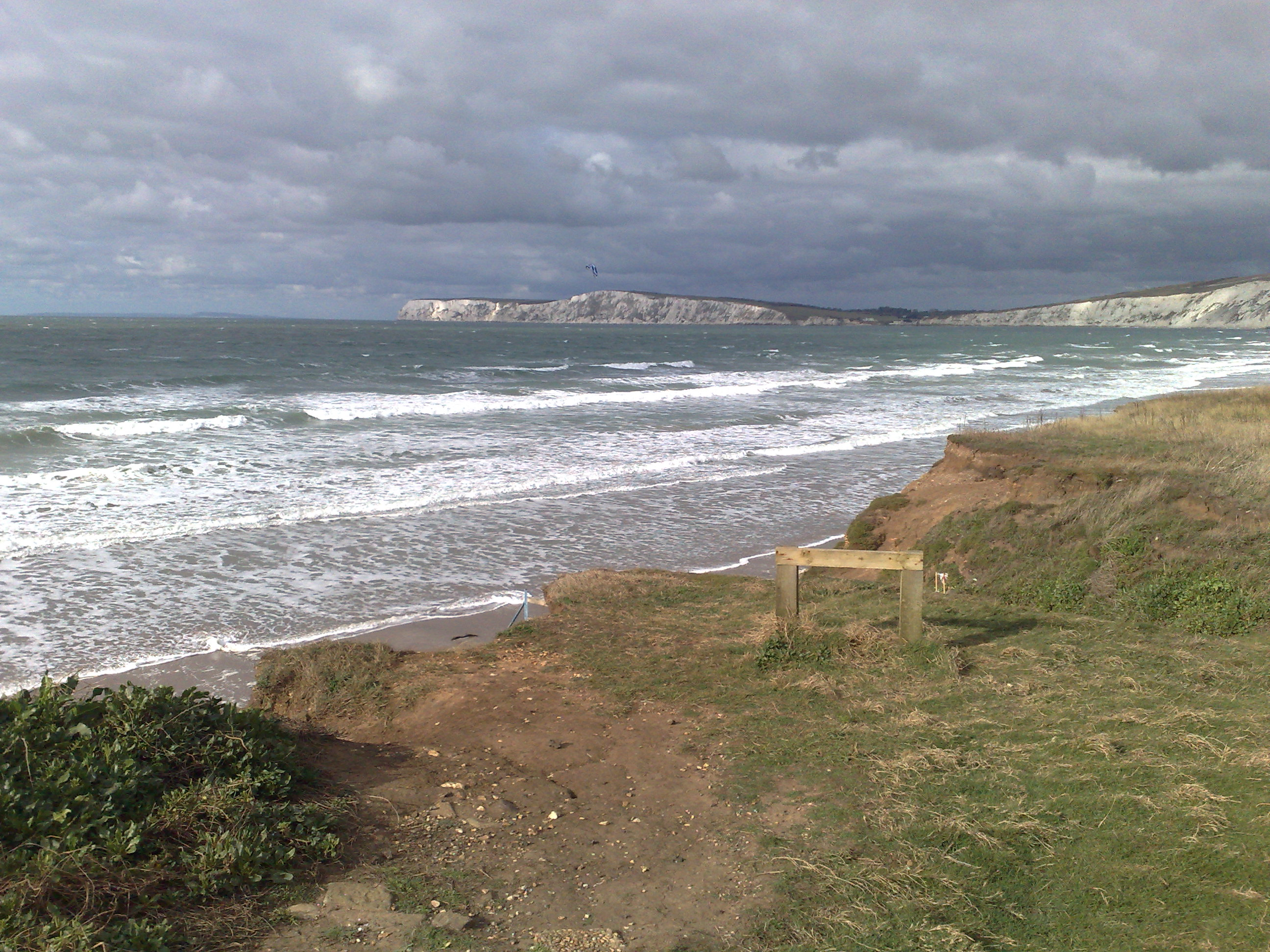
Compton Bay looking north west to Tennyson Down

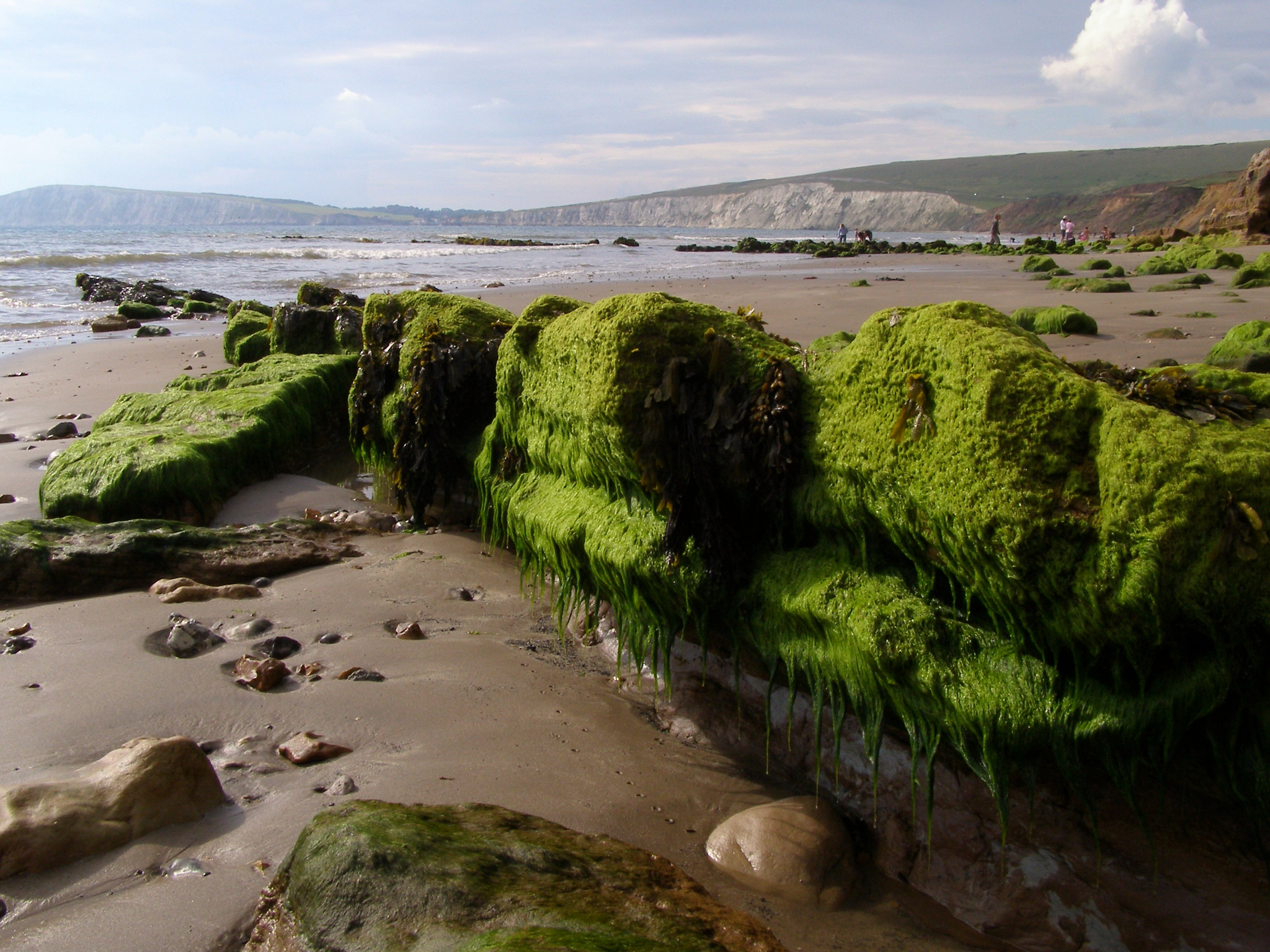
Shore at the southern end of Compton Bay

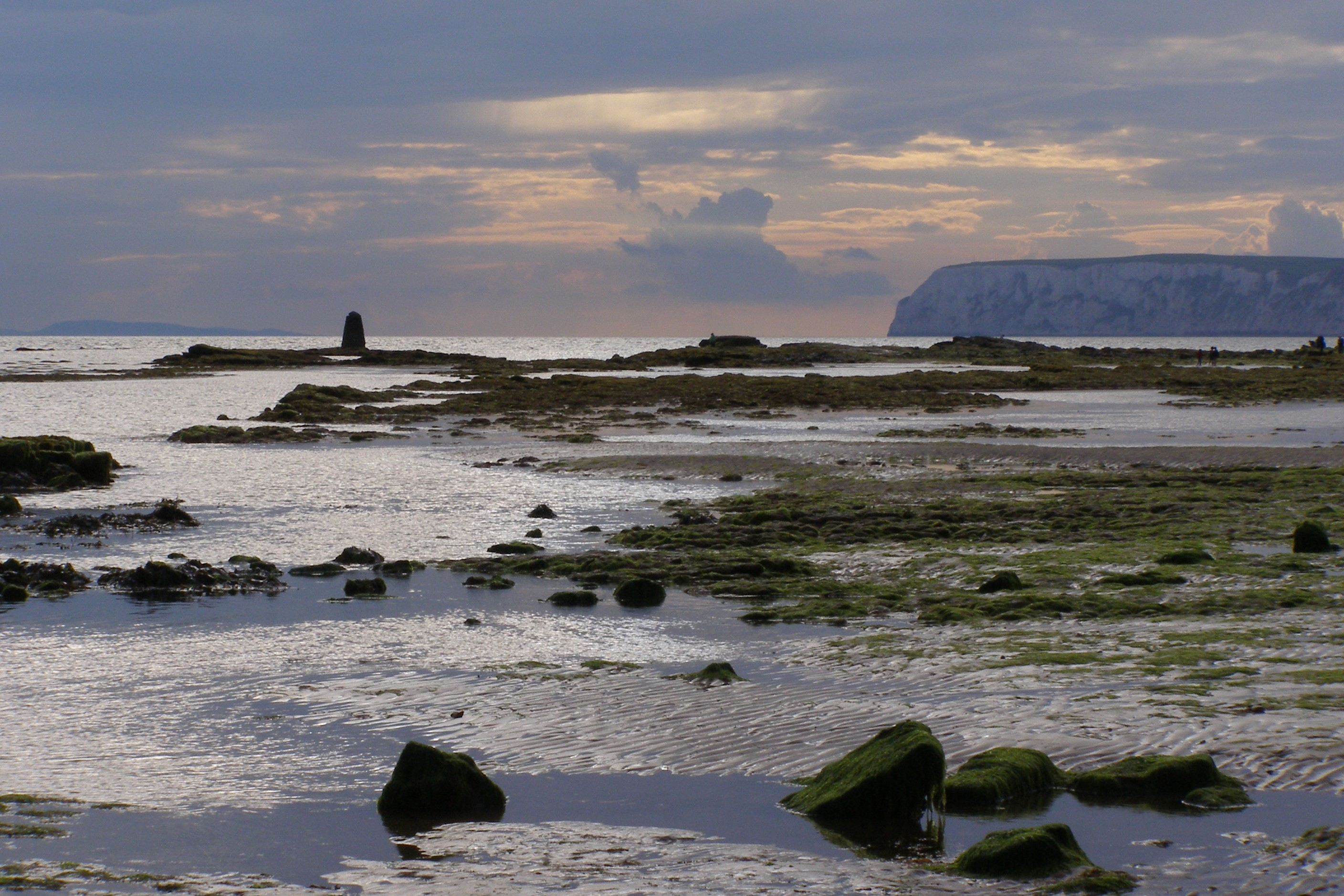
Low tide at Hanover Point

== Surfing ==
Compton Bay is the Isle of wight's most famous surf spot. The Bay has a choice of a rocky reef break or a slightly tamer but heavier sandbar break.
