= Anaipadi Formation =

Geological formation in Southern India

Anaipadi formation
- Stratigraphic range: Coniacian; ~88–86 Ma
- Type: Geological formation
- Underlies: Ariyalur Group

Location
- Country: India

The Anapadi Formation is a geological formation dating back to the Late Cretaceous Period (Coniacian) of India.

== Description ==
The Anaipadi Formation preserves fossils from a neritic environment (the relatively shallow part of the ocean above the drop-off of the continental shelf). The upper portion of the unit, which is marked by the presence of the ammonite Kossmaticeras theobaldianum. The Anaipadi Formation preserves a rich mollusc fauna. including common fossils of ammonites and inoceramids, as well as brachiopods. Fossils of marine reptiles have also been found, although they are rare. It has been suggested that the abundant brachiopods and inoceramids in the upper Anaipadi Formation indicates a transgressive environment.

In addition to the marine life found in the upper Anaipadi Formation, terrestrial matter was in the area evidently prone to being carried out to sea. Among other finds recovered in the unit are for instance a large amount of petrified wood. The presence of large quantities of wood indicates that land with dense vegetation was located relatively close a marine environment

== Fossil Content ==
Rare fossils of Marine Reptiles are found in the Anaipadi formation as well.

Dinosaurs of the Anaipadi formation
Genus	Species	Location	Material	Notes	Images
Dravidosaurus	D. blanfordi	West of the village of Siranattam	GSI SR Pal 1, a partial skull, as well as fossils identified as an isolated tooth, a sacrum, an ilium, an ischium, ten armor plates, and a tail spike, designated (in order) as GSI SR Pal 2–7.[7] Yadigiri and Ayyasami identified several of the skull bones in GSI SR Pal 1, of which the most well-preserved were the parietals, frontals, supraorbitals, squamosal, and quadrate.In addition to the armor plate GSI SR Pal 6, nine other fossils identified as armor plates were found associated with the referred specimens.	A possible late surviving Stegosaur	Skull diagram of Dravidosaurus

Sharks of the Anaipadi formation
Genus	Species	Location	Notes	Material	Images
Squalicorax	S.sp.		A lamniform shark		Squalicorax falcatus
Dwardius	D. sp.		A cardabiodontid lamniform shark		
Cretalamna?	C.? sp.		An Otodontid lamniform shark		Cretalamna
Eostritolamia	E. sp.		An Odontaspitid lamniform shark		
Protosqualus	P. sp.		A dogfish		
Gladioserratus?	G.? sp		A cow shark		

Molluscs of the Anaipadi formation
Genus	Species	Location	Material	Notes	Images
Kossmaticeras	K. theobaldianum			A Kosmaticeratid ammonite	

The formation also contains fossils of other ammonites, inoceramids and brachiopods.
