= Karapadites =

Karapadites Temporal range: Santonian–Campanian

Scientific classification
- Kingdom: Animalia
- Phylum: Mollusca
- Class: Cephalopoda
- Subclass: †Ammonoidea
- Order: †Ammonitida
- Family: †Kossmaticeratidae
- Subfamily: †Kossmaticeratinae
- Genus: †Karapadites

Genus of molluscs (fossil)

Karapadites is an extinct ammonoid genus belonging to the desmoceratacean family Kossmaticeratidae and is considered by some to be a subgenus of Kossmaticeras.

Karapadites (=K(Karapadites)) which lived during the Late Cretaceous in the late Campanian has a strongly ribbed evolute shell, all whorls exposed, ribs crossing the rounded outer rim, or venter.
