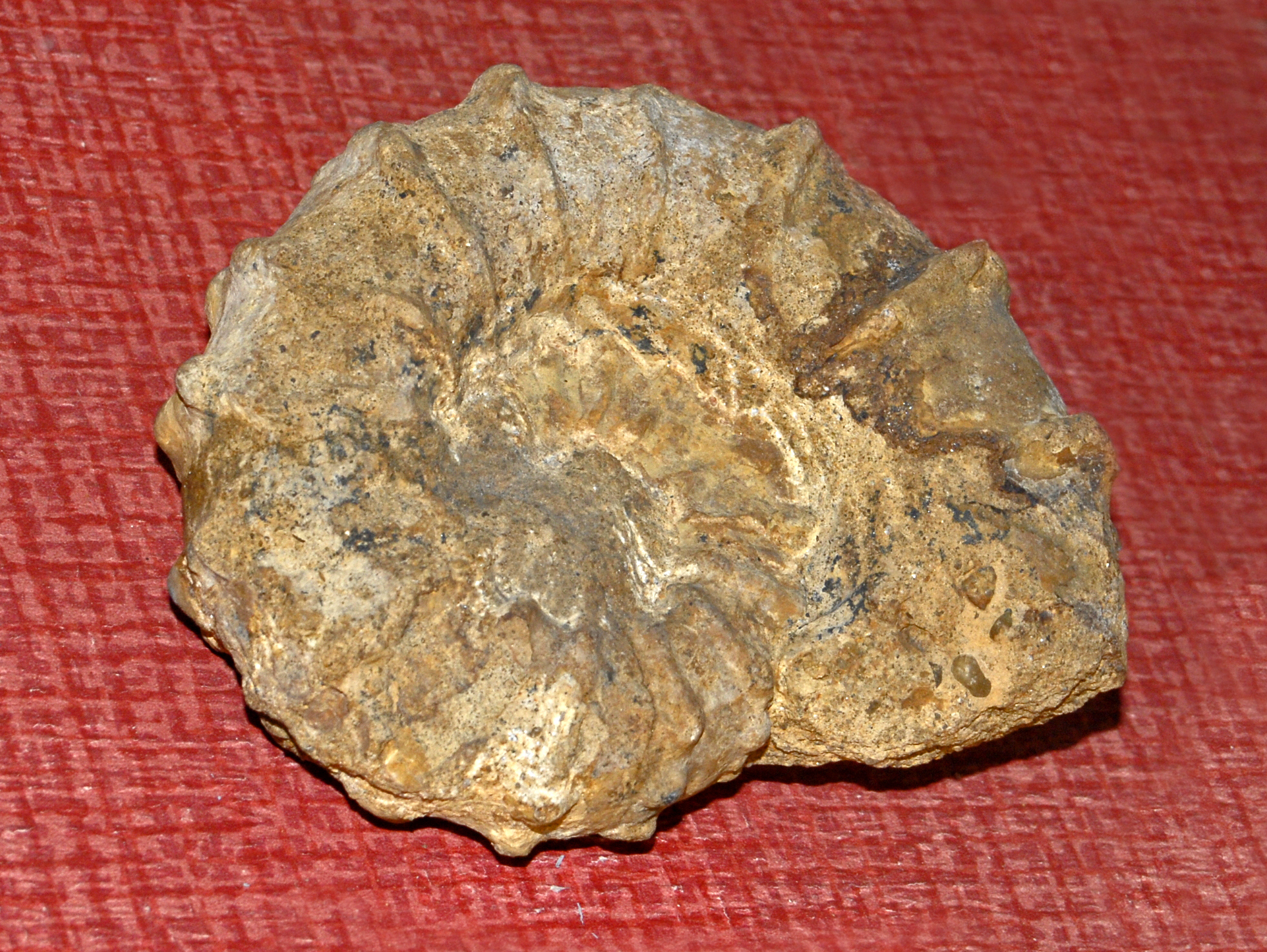
- Kossmaticeras species from Madagascar

Scientific classification
- Kingdom: Animalia
- Phylum: Mollusca
- Class: Cephalopoda
- Subclass: †Ammonoidea
- Order: †Ammonitida
- Family: †Kossmaticeratidae
- Subfamily: †Kossmaticeratinae
- Genus: †Kossmaticeras de Grossouvre, 1901

Synonyms
- Kossmaticeras (Madrasites) Kilian and Reboul, 1909; Madrasites Kilian and Reboul, 1909

= Kossmaticeras =

Kossmaticeras Temporal range: Late Cretaceous Late Turonian to Late Maastrichtian

Genus of extinct molluscs

Kossmaticeras is an extinct ammonoid genus belonging to the desmoceratacean family Kossmaticeratidae. Species in this genus were fast-moving nektonic carnivores. They lived during the Late Cretaceous, from the upper Turonian to the upper Maastrichtian ages. The type species of the genus is K. theobaldianus.

== Subgenera and species ==
- Kossmaticeras (Karapadites) Collignon, 1954
  - Kossmaticeras (Karapadites) besairieri Collignon, 1954
  - Kossmaticeras (Karapadites) karapadensis Kossmat, 1897
  - Kossmaticeras (Karapadites) madrasinus Stoliczka, 1865
  - Kossmaticeras (Karapadites) planissimus Collignon, 1966
- Kossmaticeras (Kossmaticeras) de Grossouvre, 1901
  - Kossmaticeras (Kossmaticeras) inornatum Collignon, 1966
  - Kossmaticeras (Kossmaticeras) jeletzkyi Collignon, 1965
  - Kossmaticeras (Kossmaticeras) jonesi Collignon, 1965
  - Kossmaticeras (Kossmaticeras) kilenensis Alsen, 2018
  - Kossmaticeras (Kossmaticeras) sakondryense Collignon, 1954
  - Kossmaticeras (Kossmaticeras) sparsicostatum Kossmat, 1897
  - Kossmaticeras (Kossmaticeras) theobaldianum Stolickza, 1865
- Kossmaticeras (Natalites) Collignon, 1954
  - Kossmaticeras (Natalites) africanus van Hoepen, 1920
  - Kossmaticeras (Natalites) elegans Kennedy, 1985
  - Kossmaticeras (Natalites) similis Spath, 1921
  - Kossmaticeras (Natalites) canadense McLearn, 1972

== Distribution ==
Fossils of species within this genus have been found in the Cretaceous sediments of Antarctica, Australia, Canada, Chile, India, Madagascar, New Zealand and South Africa.
