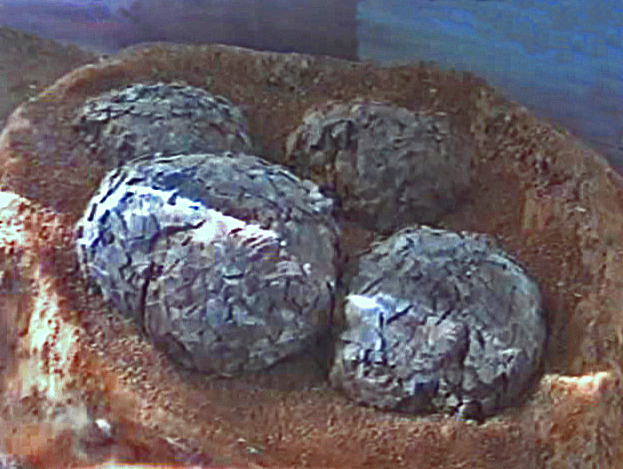
- Megaloolithus at the Museum d'Histoire Naturelle Aix-en-Provence. Eggs of titanosaurid, possibly Hypselosaurus priscus

Egg fossil classification
- Basic shell type: †Dinosauroid-spherulitic
- Oofamily: †Megaloolithidae
- Oogenus: †Megaloolithus; Mikhailov, 1991

Oospecies
- See text

= Megaloolithus =

Megaloolithus Temporal range: Late Cretaceous

Dinosaur egg

Megaloolithus is an oogenus of dinosaur egg. They are thought to have been laid by sauropod dinosaurs. They are known for having thick eggshells, at least 1.5 millimetres (0.059 in) thick, and the nearly spherical shape of the eggs. They are primarily found in India and Europe, but some specimens have been found in South America.

== Species ==
- M. aureliensis
- M. baghensis
- M. cylindricus
- M. dhoridungriensis
- M. jabalpurensis
- M. khempurensis
- M. mamillare
- M. megadermus
- M. microtuberculata
- M. mohabeyi
- M. petralta
- M. problematica
- M. siruguei
- M. trempii
- M. patagonicus

== Distribution ==
Fossils of Megaloolithus have been found in:

- Anacleto Formation - Argentina
- Argiles et Grés à Reptiles, Rognacian, Marnes Rouges Inférieures & Marnes Rouges de Roquelongue Formation - France
- Lameta Formation and Kallakurichi Formation - India
- Sânpetru Formation - Romania
- Figuerola, La Maçana & Tremp Formations - Spain

== Gallery ==
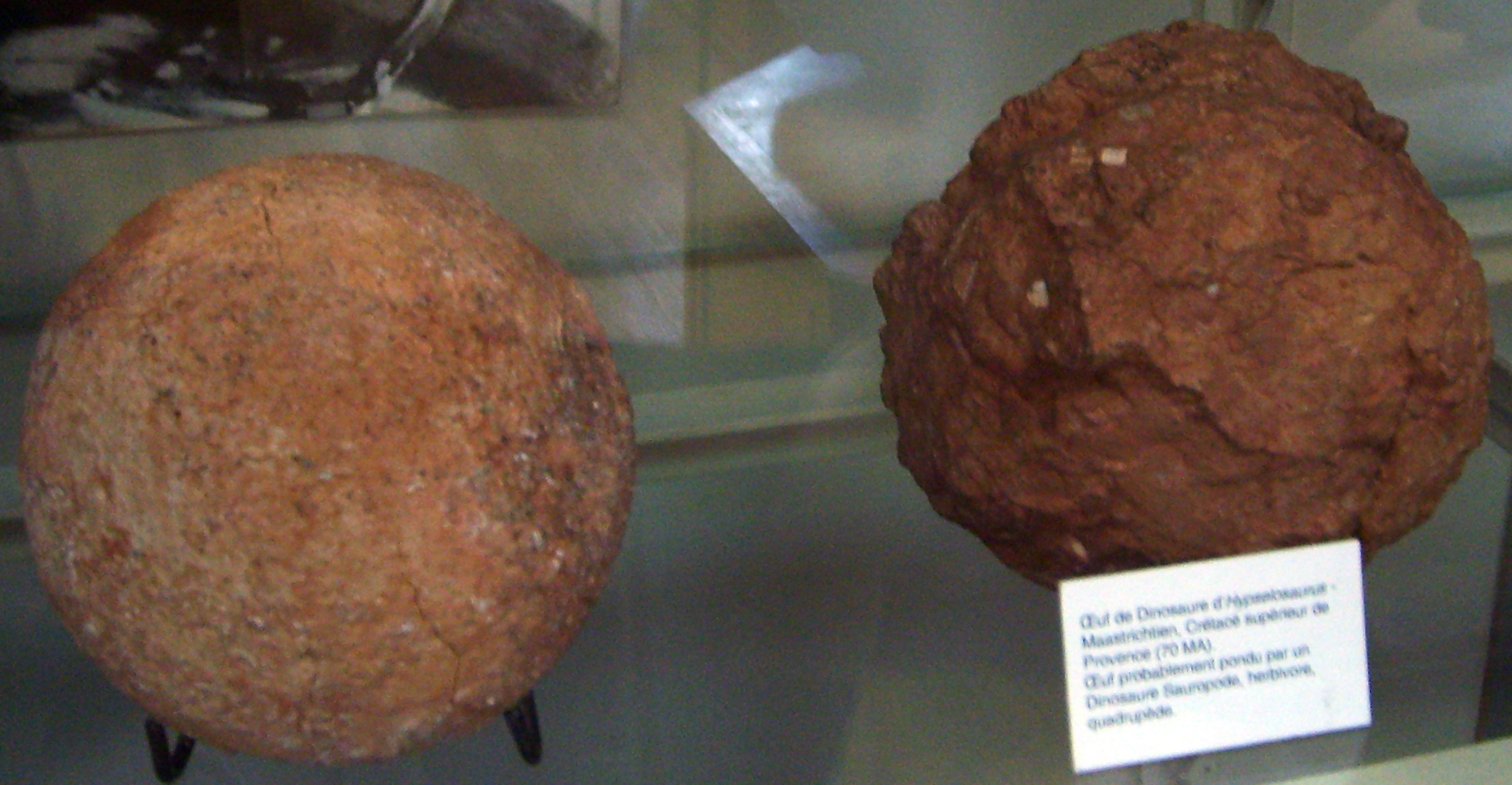
Hypselosaurus eggs, Muséum national d'histoire naturelle, Paris

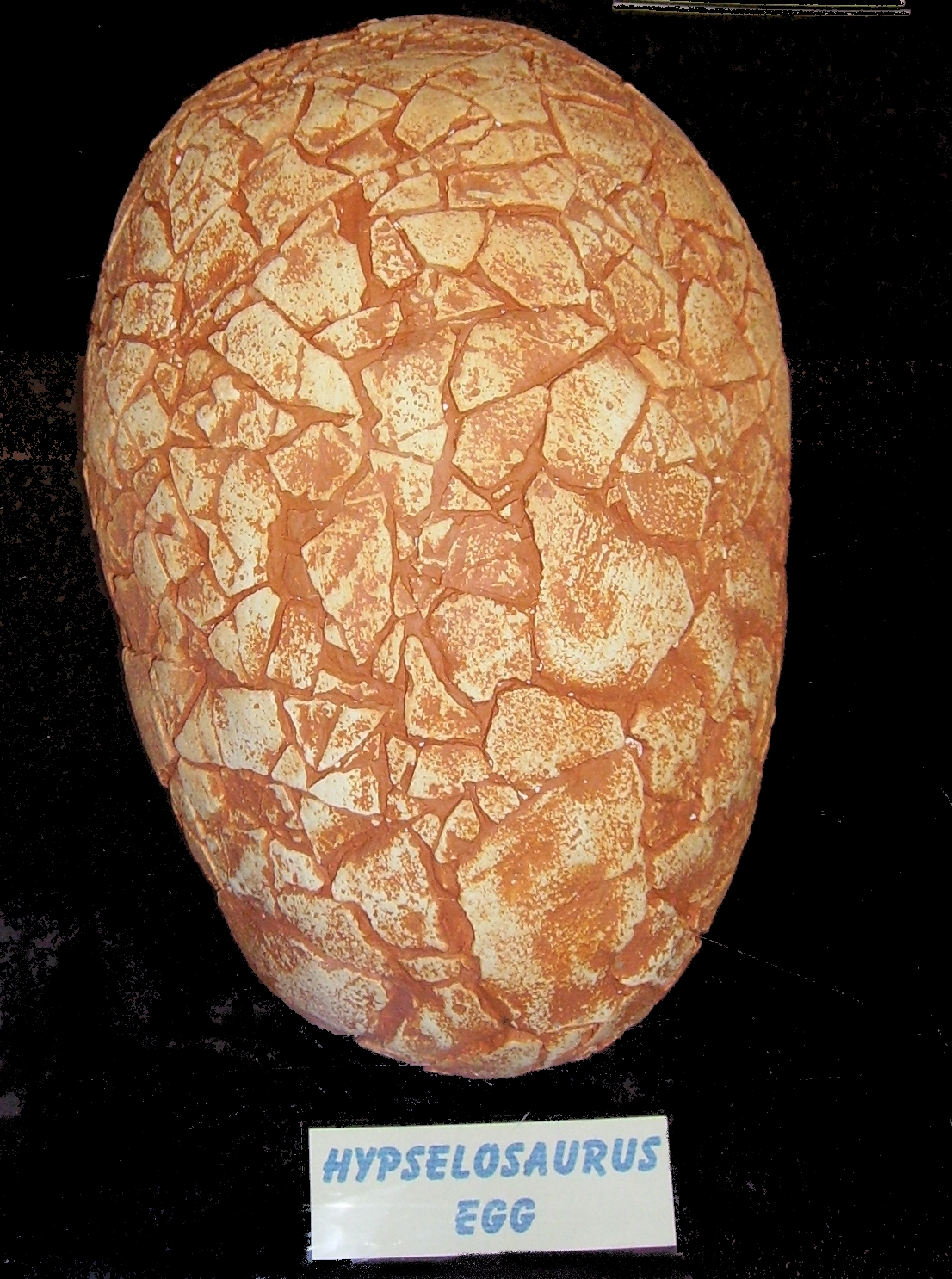
A Hypselosaurus egg (Dinosaurland, Lyme Regis)

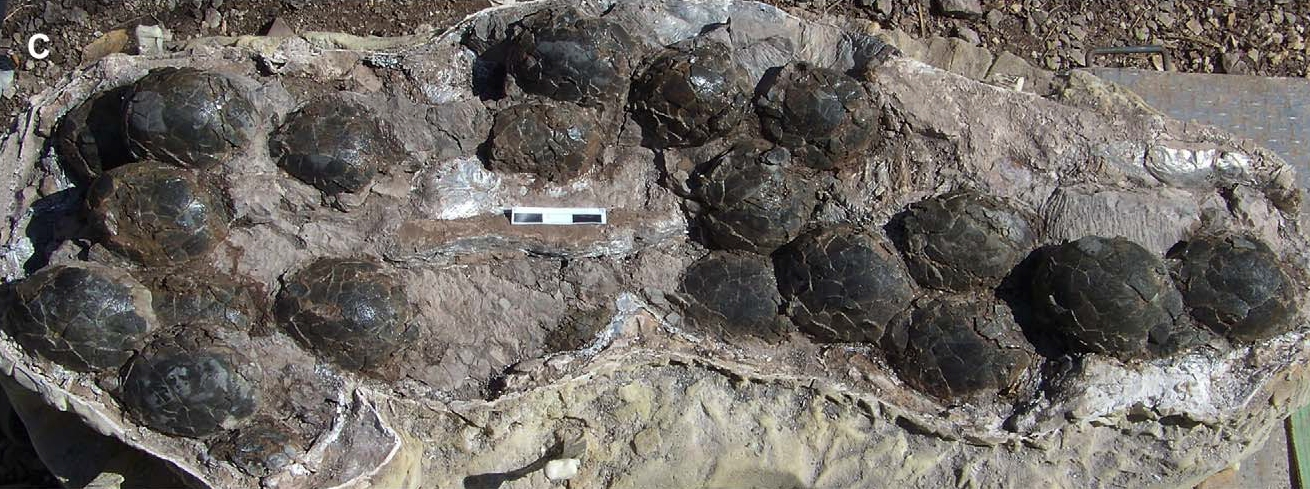
Megaloolithus siruguei of the Tremp Formation

== See also ==
- List of dinosaur oogenera
