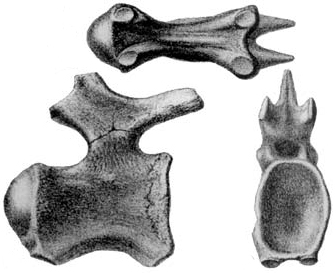
- Titanosaurus indicus holotypic distal caudal vertebra

Scientific classification
- Kingdom: Animalia
- Phylum: Chordata
- Class: Reptilia
- Clade: Dinosauria
- Clade: Saurischia
- Clade: †Sauropodomorpha
- Clade: †Sauropoda
- Clade: †Eusauropoda
- Clade: †Macronaria
- Clade: †Titanosauria
- Genus: †Titanosaurus; Lydekker, 1877

Type species
- †Titanosaurus indicus Lydekker, 1877

Other species
- †T. blanfordi Lydekker, 1879

Synonyms
- Titanosaurus blandfordi (sic); Tritonausaurus (sic); Tritonosaurus (sic)

= Titanosaurus =

Titanosaurus Temporal range: Late Cretaceous, 70–66 Ma

Extinct genus of dinosaurs

Titanosaurus (/taɪˌtænəˈsɔːrəs/; lit. 'titanic lizard') is a dubious genus of sauropod dinosaurs, first described by Richard Lydekker in 1877. It is known from the Maastrichtian (Upper Cretaceous) Lameta and Kallakurichi Formations of India.

== Discovery and naming ==
Titanosaurus, literally meaning 'titanic lizard', was named after the Titans of Greek mythology.

Titanosaurus was the first Indian dinosaur to be named and properly described, having been recorded for the first time in 1877. The type species, T. indicus, was named in 1877, and the second species, T. blanfordi, was named in 1879. Both species were named by Richard Lydekker. T. indicus and T. blanfordi are 70 million years old.

Both species are known from the Lameta Formation, while indeterminate remains assigned to Titanosaurus have also been collected from the Kallakurichi Formation.

=== Titanosaurus indicus ===
The holotype vertebrae of Titanosaurus indicus were discovered during an exploration to Jabalpur in 1828 by Captain William Henry Sleeman of the East India Company army. He was one among many explorations for fossils initially carried out by army personnel, medical doctors and priests who chanced upon them just by being "fairly literate and mobile at the time". He stumbled across the vertebrae on Bara Simla Hill near a British Army gun carriage workshop while searching for petrified wood. Sleeman, employed by the Bengal Army, regarded the bones as curiosities. He gave two vertebral pieces to surgeon G. G. Spilsbury, who had a practice in Japalpur and who also excavated a bone himself. Spilsbury sent the fossils in 1832 to the antiquarian James Prinsep in Calcutta, who realised that they were fossilised bones and then sent them back to Sleeman. In 1862, Thomas Oldham, the first director of the newly established Geological Survey of India, transferred the vertebrae from Japalpur to Calcutta and added them to the collection of the Indian Museum. There, the bones were studied by the Survey's supervisor, Hugh Falconer, who concluded that they were reptilian bones. After Falconer's death, in 1877, Richard Lydekker described the vertebrae as a new species of reptile known as Titanosaurus indicus.

The known remains of T. indicus were generally considered to be lost and untraceable by the end of the twentieth century; in 2010 Matthew Carrano therefore established a cast based on illustrations Lydekker made in 1877, as a replacement plastotype, with the inventory number NHMUK 40867. However, that turned out to be a bit premature. In the early twenty-first century, Indian paleontologist Dhananjay Mohabey understood that such specimens were lost only because no serious inventory of the collections had been carried out for generations. He therefore started the Study of Late Cretaceous Tetrapod fossils from Lameta Formation project with support from the University of Michigan, with one of the main goals of locating lost specimens. In this context, he and Subhasis Sengupta recovered one of the holotype vertebra on 25 April 2012. It turned out to be in a batch of fossils that had been left behind by Lydekker in 1878 that had been lost up until then, which is why no official inventory number of the GSI had been assigned to it.

Part of the fossils that Lydekker assigned to the type specimen of T. indicus, that formed a series of syntypes, was a 1.5-metre-long (4.9 ft) femur that had been excavated at the same location in 1871 or 1872 by Henry Benedict Medlicott—specimen GSI K22/754. In 1933 this was reassigned by Charles Alfred Matley and Friedrich von Huene to Antarctosaurus septentrionalis, which was moved to the new genus Jainosaurus in 1995.

=== Titanosaurus blanfordi ===
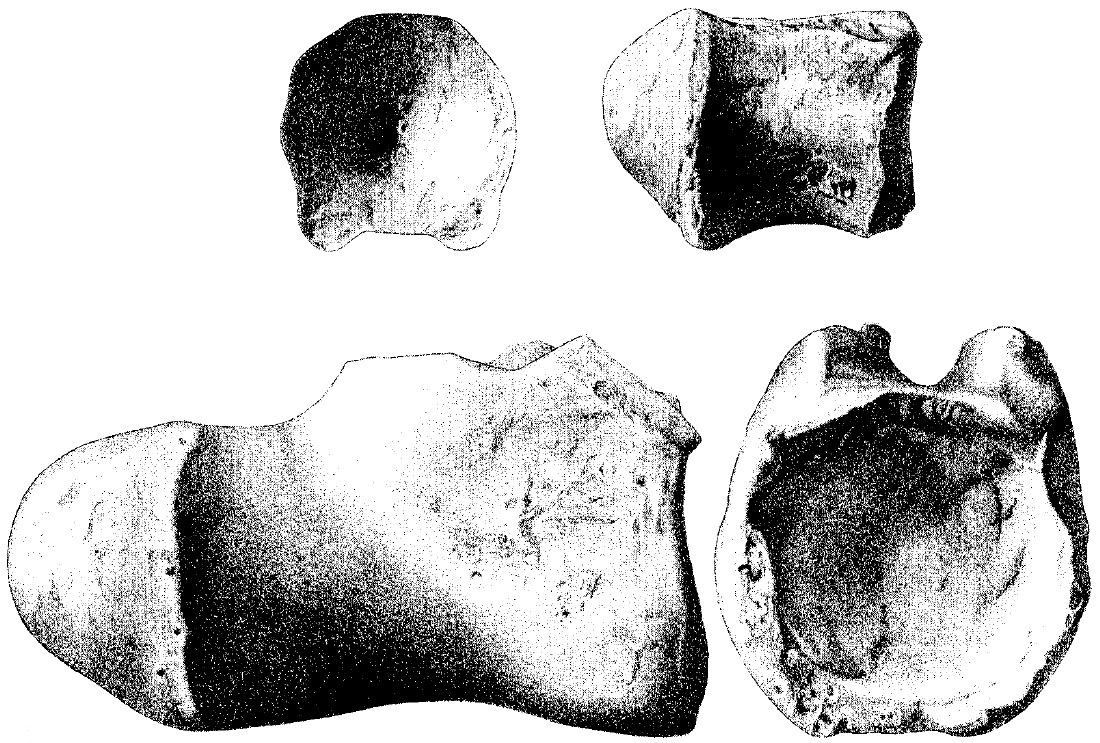
T. blanfordi holotype distal caudal vertebra (GSI 2195)

Between 1860 and 1870, geologist William Thomas Blanford had found two sauropod middle caudal vertebrae near Pisdura (one vertebra, GSI 2195, became the type specimen). In 1879, they were named by Lydekker as a second species of Titanosaurus, T. Blanfordi, which according to current rules should be written as Titanosaurus blanfordi. Of the two fossils, making up specimen GSI IM K27 / 501, the second, smaller vertebra was split off by von Huene in 1929 and assigned to Titanosaurus araukanicus (now Laplatasaurus).

Upchurch & Wilson concluded in their 2003 revision that this assignment was unfounded, although there is indeed no evidence beyond their origin that the two vertebrae have anything to do with each other. The large vertebra, strongly procoel, convex in front, is distinguished by a square cross-section, the lack of a trough on the underside and elongated proportions. These features are also found in other titanosaurs, although not found in India – the latter, however, was insufficient reason for Upchurch & Wilson not to speak of a nomen dubium.

The holotype vertebrae of T. blanfordi were also missing for years and were rediscovered in 2012 by Dhananjay Mohabey and Subhasis Sengupta at the same location as the holotype of T. indicus.

== Classification ==
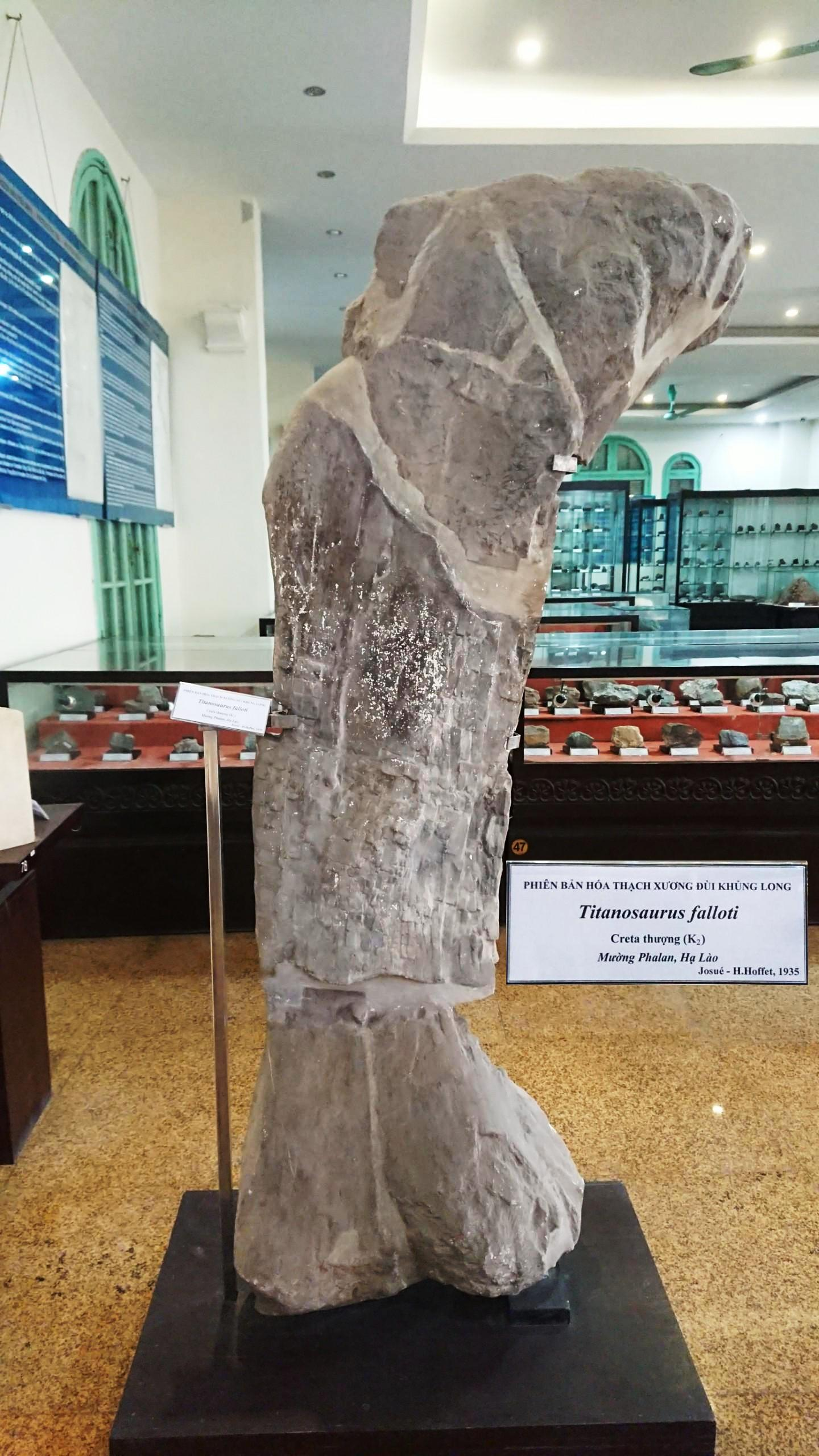
"T." falloti femur

Wilson & Upchurch (2003) treated Titanosaurus as a nomen dubium ("dubious name") because they noted that the original Titanosaurus specimens cannot be distinguished from those of related animals.

=== Species ===
As the type genus of Titanosauria, Titanosaurus at times became a wastebasket taxon for a number of titanosaurs, including those not just from India but also southern Europe, Laos and South America. Only two among these, however, are currently considered species of Titanosaurus: T. indicus and T. blandfordi, both of which are considered nomina dubia.

Other species formerly referred to this genus include:

- "Titanosaurus" rahioliensis – Described based on teeth, this species is now considered an indeterminate neosauropod as it shows similarities to Nigersaurus teeth.
- "Titanosaurus" colberti – This species was the most well-known species of Titanosaurus, but has been moved into its own genus, Isisaurus.
- "Titanosaurus" australis – Known from relatively complete remains, but has been renamed Neuquensaurus.
- "Titanosaurus" nanus – A small species found to be non diagnostic, and hence a nomen dubium.
- "Titanosaurus" robustus – Now referred to Neuquensaurus.
- "Titanosaurus" madagascariensis – Nomen dubium; UCB 92305 apparently related to Vahiny, while UCM 92829 has been reassigned to Rapetosaurus.
- "Titanosaurus" falloti – This large species, native to Laos, has disputed affinities. It has been considered synonymous with Tangvayosaurus and Huabeisaurus, but the remains are too fragmentary to be sure.
- "Titanosaurus" valdensis – Referred to a new genus, Iuticosaurus, but still considered a nomen dubium.
- "Titanosaurus" lydekkeri – Also referred to Iuticosaurus, but its relation to I. valdensis is uncertain.
- "Titanosaurus" dacus – A dwarf titanosaur; now moved to the genus Magyarosaurus.

== Palaeoecology ==
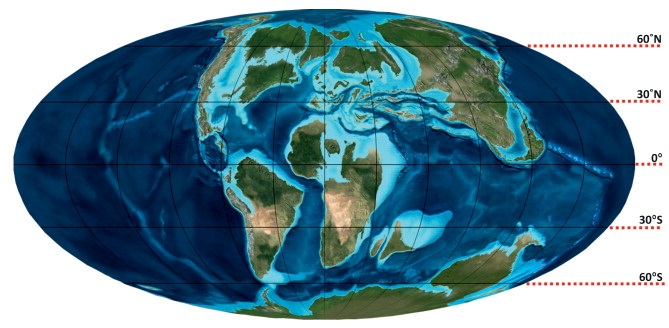
India was an island in the Late Cretaceous.

Titanosaurus indicus has been found in the Lameta Formation, a rock unit radiometrically dated to the Maastrichtian age of the latest Cretaceous representing an arid or semi-arid landscape with a river flowing through it—probably providing shrub cover near the water—which formed between episodes of volcanism in the Deccan Traps. Titanosaurus likely inhabited what is now the Narmada River Valley. The formation is known for being a sauropod nesting site, yielding several dinosaur eggs, and sauropod herds likely chose sandy soil for nesting; though eggs belonging to large theropods have been found. Sauropod coprolite remains indicate they lived in a forested landscape, consuming plants such as Podocarpus, Araucaria and Cheirolepidiaceae conifers; cycads; palm trees; early grass; and Caryophyllaceae, Sapindaceae and Acanthaceae flowering plants. Ferns were also common in India with Osmundaceae, Schizaeales, Dicksoniaceae, Gleicheniaceae and Salviniales being found. The prehistoric snake Sanajeh mainly raided the nests of sauropods for eggs.

India, by the Late Cretaceous, had separated from Madagascar and South America during the break-up of Gondwana, and Titanosaurus lived on an isolated island, likely causing endemism and unique characteristics not seen in other abelisaurids. However, despite being an island, there is no evidence of endemic animals with unique traits from Late Cretaceous India, perhaps indicating a continued connection to other parts of the world, likely Africa due to its closer proximity to India than other continents. The similarity between European and Indian sauropod egg taxa suggests an inter-continental migration of animals between India, Europe and South America during the Cretaceous, despite water barriers.

Several dinosaurs have been described from the Lameta Formation, such as the noasaurid theropod Laevisuchus; abelisaurids Indosaurus, Indosuchus, Lametasaurus, Rahiolisaurus and Rajasaurus; and the other titanosaurian sauropods Jainosaurus and Isisaurus. The diversity of abelisauroid and titanosaurian dinosaurs in Cretaceous India indicates they shared close affinities to the dinosaur life of the other Gondwanan continents, which had similar inhabitants. While some authors have suggested that the Deccan Traps had a major adverse effect on the climate of India and its dinosaur inhabitants, others have suggested that the effects of the volcanism were relatively mild.
