= Fournierella massiliensis =

Scientific classification
- Domain: Bacteria
- Kingdom: Bacillati
- Phylum: Bacillota
- Class: Clostridia
- Order: Oscillospirales
- Family: Oscillospiraceae
- Genus: Fournierella; Togo et al. 2017
- Species: F. massiliensis

Binomial name
- Fournierella massiliensis Togo et al. 2017

Species of bacterium

Fournierella massiliensis is a bacterium of the monotypic genus Fournierella in the family Oscillospiraceae.
