= Fusioolithus =

Fusioolithus Temporal range: Late Cretaceous - paleogene

Egg fossil classification
- Basic shell type: †Dinosauroid-spherulitic
- Oofamily: †Fusioolithidae
- Oogenus: †Fusioolithus; Fernández and Khosla, 2015

oospecies
- †Fusioolithus baghensis †Fusioolithus berthei

Extinct oospecies of dinosaurs

Fusioolithus is an oogenus of dinosaur egg. It contains two oospecies: F. baghensis and F. berthei. Fossils have been found in Spain, Argentina, France, India and Peru. They were probably laid by a titanosaur.

F. baghensis eggs may be up to 20 centimeters in diameter and up to 1.7 mm thick. F. berthei eggs have never been found intact, however, they are up to twice as thick as F. baghensis eggs.
