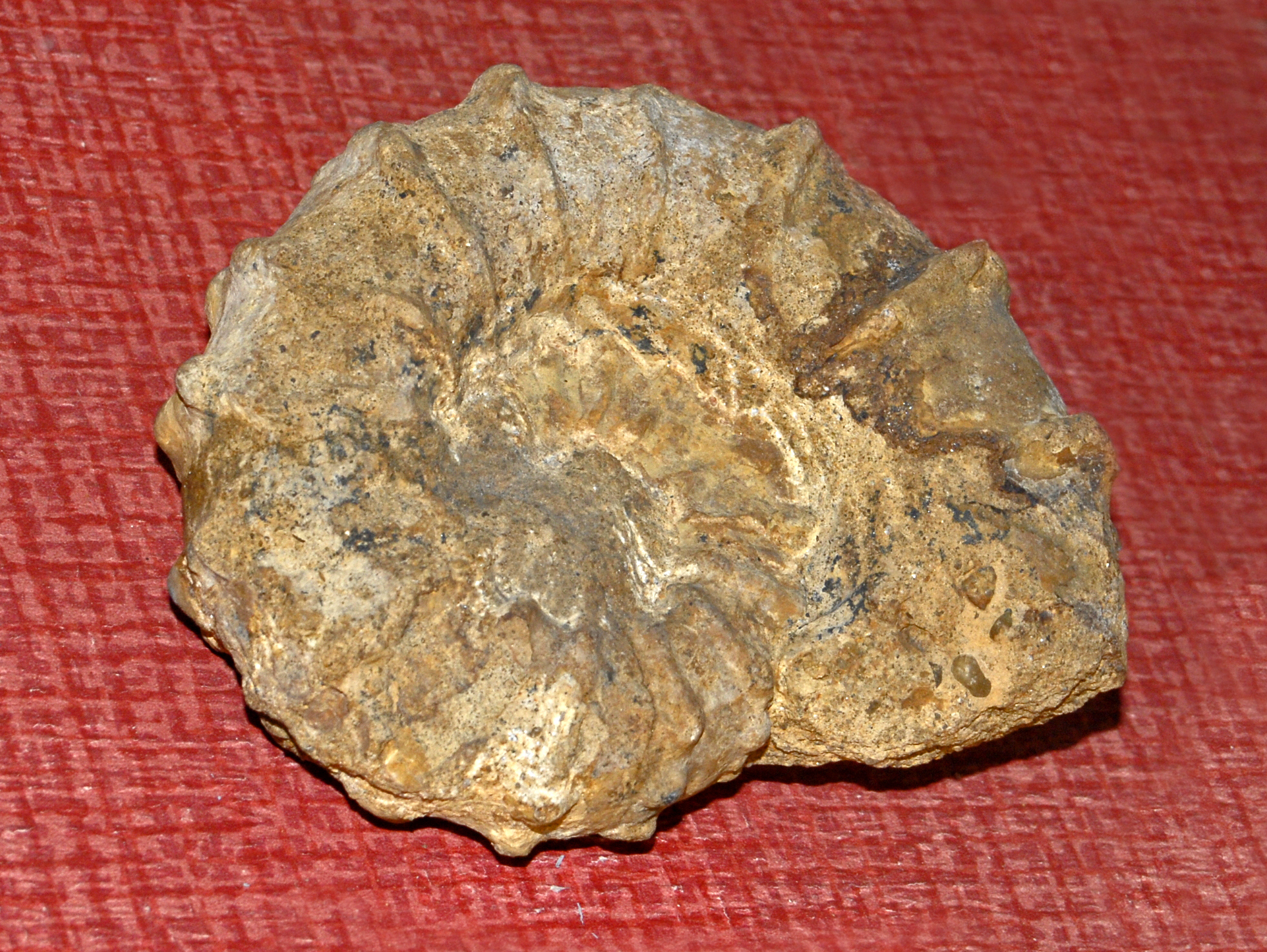
- Kossmaticeras species from Madagascar

Scientific classification
- Kingdom: Animalia
- Phylum: Mollusca
- Class: Cephalopoda
- Subclass: †Ammonoidea
- Order: †Ammonitida
- Superfamily: †Desmoceratoidea
- Family: †Kossmaticeratidae; Spath, 1922

= Kossmaticeratidae =

Kossmaticeratidae Temporal range: from, Jurassic to Cretaceous

Extinct family of molluscs

Kossmaticeratidae is an extinct ammonoid family belonging to the order Ammonitida.

== Subfamilies and genera ==
Kossmaticeratidae includes two subfamilies and eight genera:

- Kossmaticeratinae Spath, 1922
  - Grossouvrites Kilian and Reboul, 1909
  - Gunnarites Kilian and Reboul, 1909
  - Kossmaticeras de Grossouvre, 1901
  - Maorites Marshall, 1926
  - Pseudokossmaticeras Spath, 1922
- Marshallitinae Matsumoto, 1955
  - Eomarshallites Medina and Rinaldi, 1986
  - Marshallites Matsumoto, 1955
  - Yokoyamaoceras Wright and Matsumoto, 1954

== Distribution ==
Fossils of members within this family have been found in the Cretaceous sediments of Antarctica, Argentina, Australia, Austria, Belgium, Canada, Chile, France, India, Japan, Madagascar, New Zealand, South Africa, United States as well as in the Jurassic of the United Kingdom.
