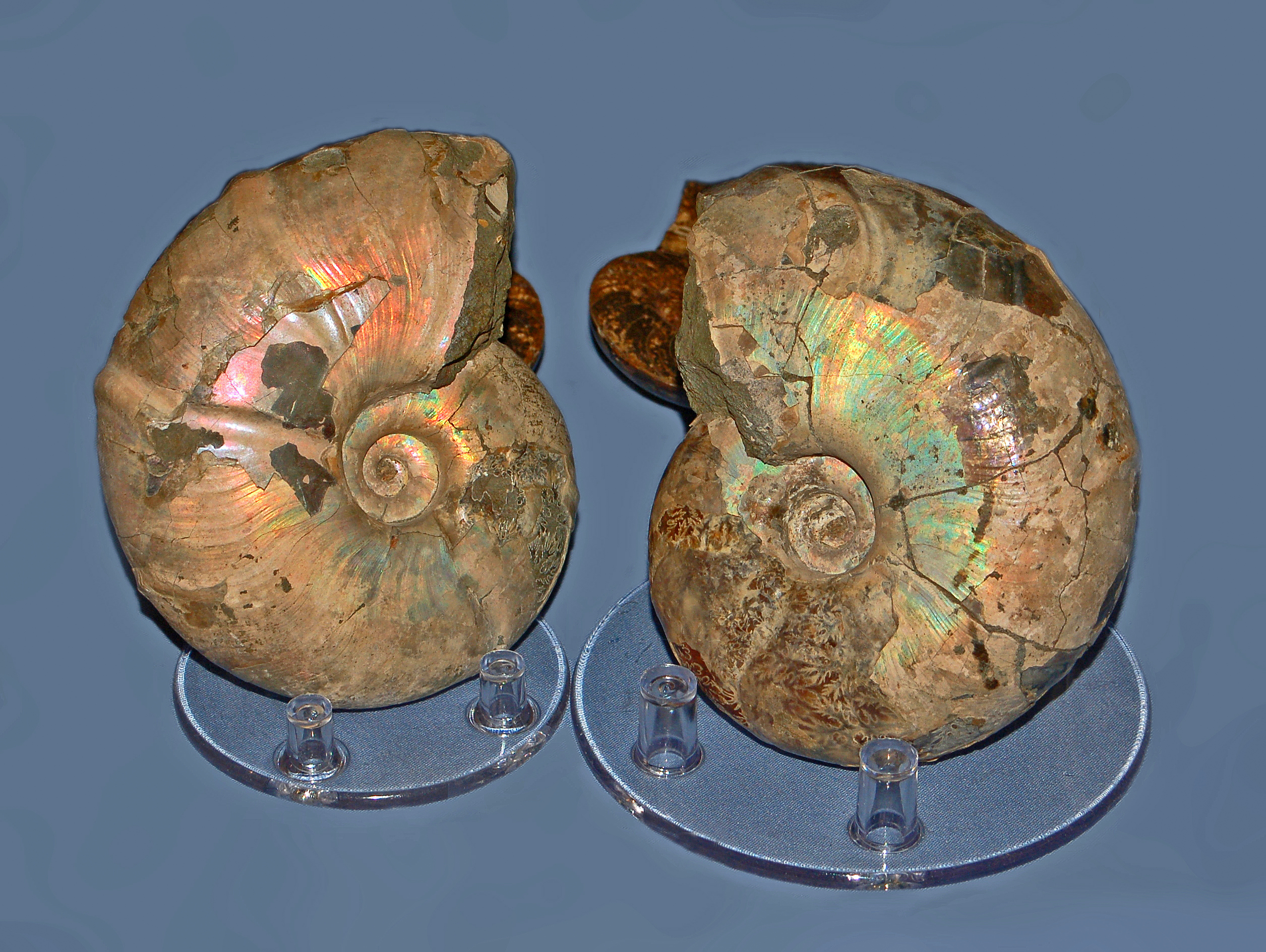
- Desmoceras sp. – Lower cretaceous (Albian) from Mahajanga, Madagascar

Scientific classification
- Kingdom: Animalia
- Phylum: Mollusca
- Class: Cephalopoda
- Subclass: †Ammonoidea
- Order: †Ammonitida
- Suborder: †Ammonitina
- Superfamily: †Desmoceratoidea; Zittel, 1895

Families
- Desmoceratidae; Holcodiscidae; Kossmaticeratidae; Muniericeratidae; Pachydiscidae; Silesitidae

Synonyms
- Desmocerataceae

= Desmoceratoidea =

Desmoceratoidea Temporal range: Valanginian - Maastrichtian

Extinct superfamily of ammonites

Desmoceratoidea, formerly Desmocerataceae, is a superfamily of Cretaceous ammonites, generally with round or oval-whorled shells that are mostly smooth or weakly ribbed and rarely tuberculate, but commonly with constrictions. Regarded as monophyletic, the Desmocerataceae are derived from the Phylloceratidae, splitting off in the Early Cretaceous (Valanginian) and persisting to the end of the Maastrichtian.
