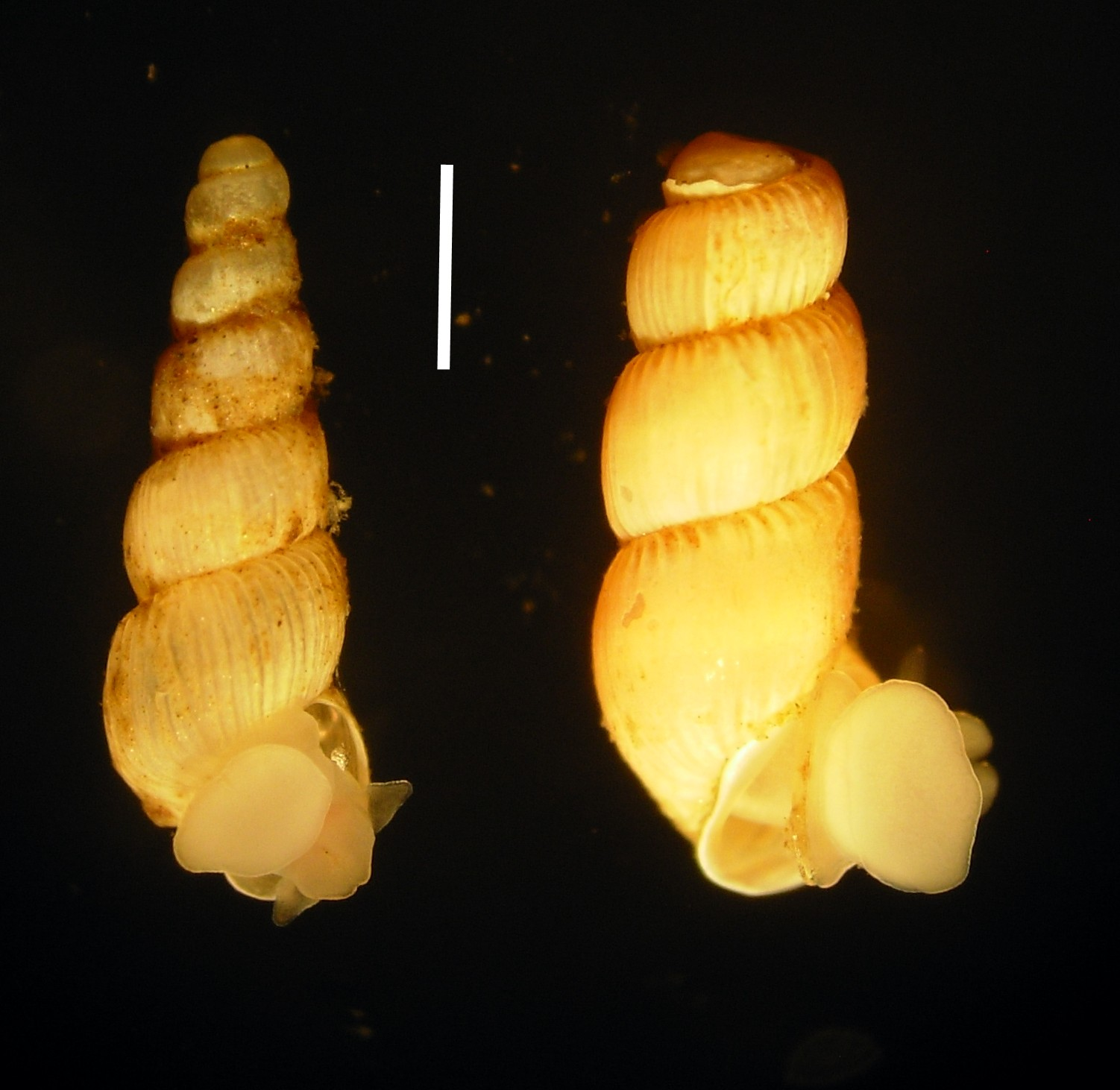
- Two live individuals of Truncatella subcylindrica: a juvenile on the left, and an adult on the right

Scientific classification
- Kingdom: Animalia
- Phylum: Mollusca
- Class: Gastropoda
- Subclass: Caenogastropoda
- Order: Littorinimorpha
- Family: Truncatellidae
- Subfamily: Truncatellinae
- Genus: Truncatella; Risso, 1826

= Truncatella (gastropod) =

Genus of gastropods

Truncatella is a genus of very small land snails with an operculum, terrestrial gastropod mollusks in the family Truncatellidae. These minute snails live in land habitats close to seawater. They walk with a looping action, and the adults have truncated shells. Many of the species are small enough to be considered micromollusks.

Truncatella is the type genus of the family Truncatellidae.

== Description ==
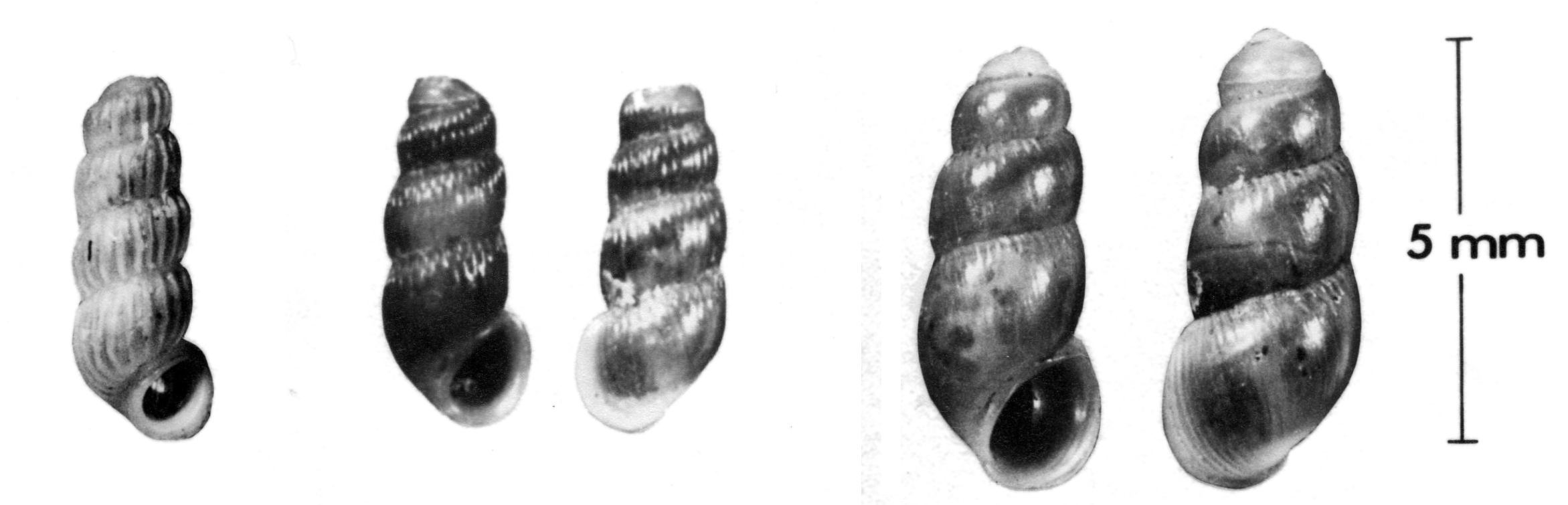
From left: Truncatella bahamensis (holotype), T. bilabiata bilabiata, T. pulchella.

As implied by the name, these snails are notable for the way they modify their elongated shells as they mature, breaking off several of the apical whorls, and forming a relatively smooth seal for the remainder of the shell.

=== Locomotion ===
The method of locomotion used by Truncatella is unusual. Instead of gliding over a slime trail using minute waves in its foot, Truncatella uses a very large and muscular proboscis to reach ahead and grasp a surface, at which point the small foot releases its hold and the proboscis contracts to pull the animal forward, after which the entire procedure is usually repeated.

== Distribution and habitat ==
This genus occurs in tropical and subtropical areas. The various species of Truncatella are pantropical in distribution, with a few exceptions such as Truncatella truncatula and Truncatella subcylindrica.

Most of the species in this genus live in a habitat that is neither fully terrestrial nor fully marine: they live under plant debris near high tide level, where they are occasionally wetted with seawater by waves. A small minority of the species are fully terrestrial.

These small snails are typically found associated with drifts of plant material, where their eggs are deposited.

The adaptations of these land snails to the terrestrial environment are not so perfect as they are in the more usual pulmonate land snails, and their terrestrial adaptations may in fact be comparatively recent.

== Species ==
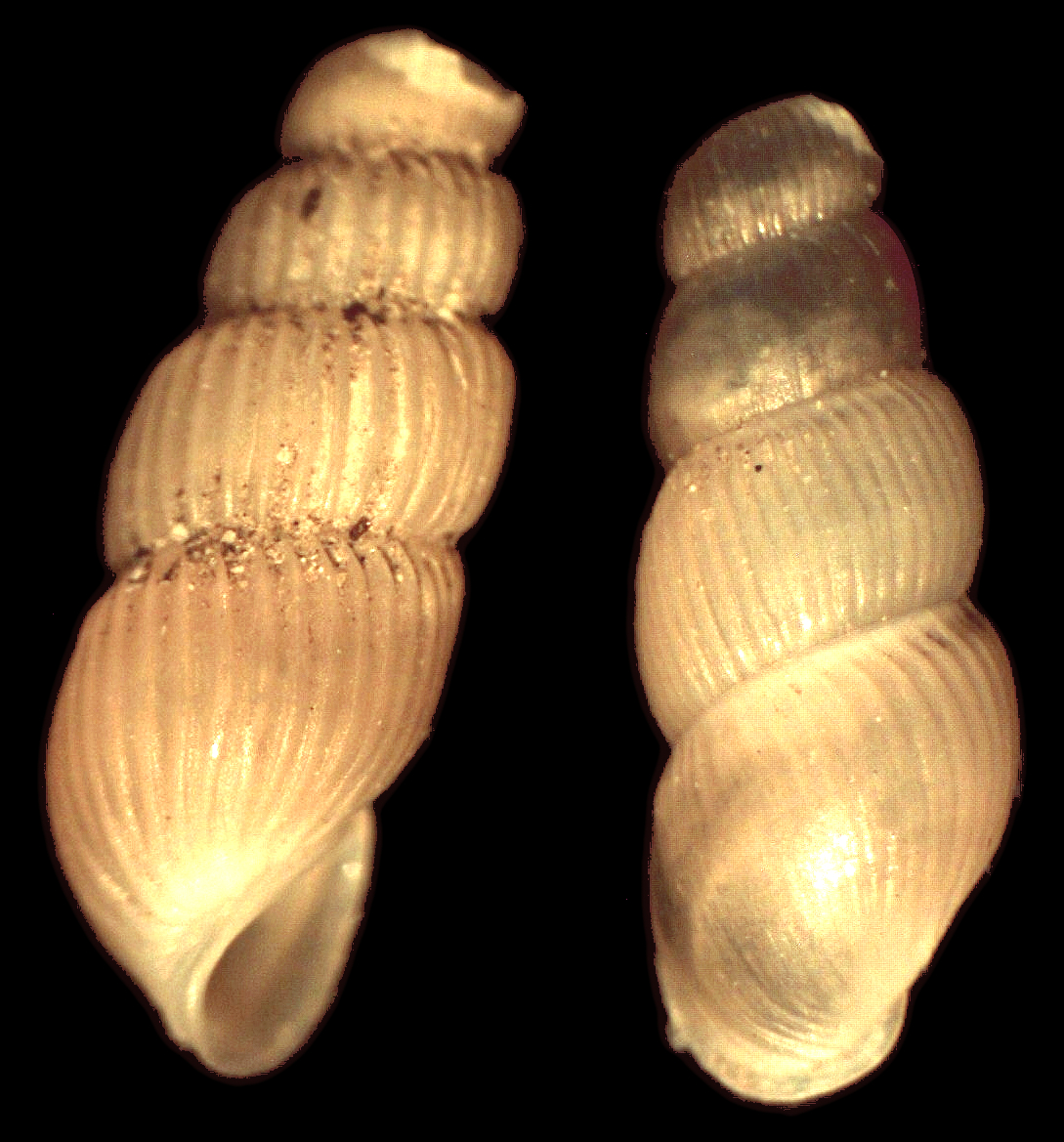
Shells of Truncatella scalarina

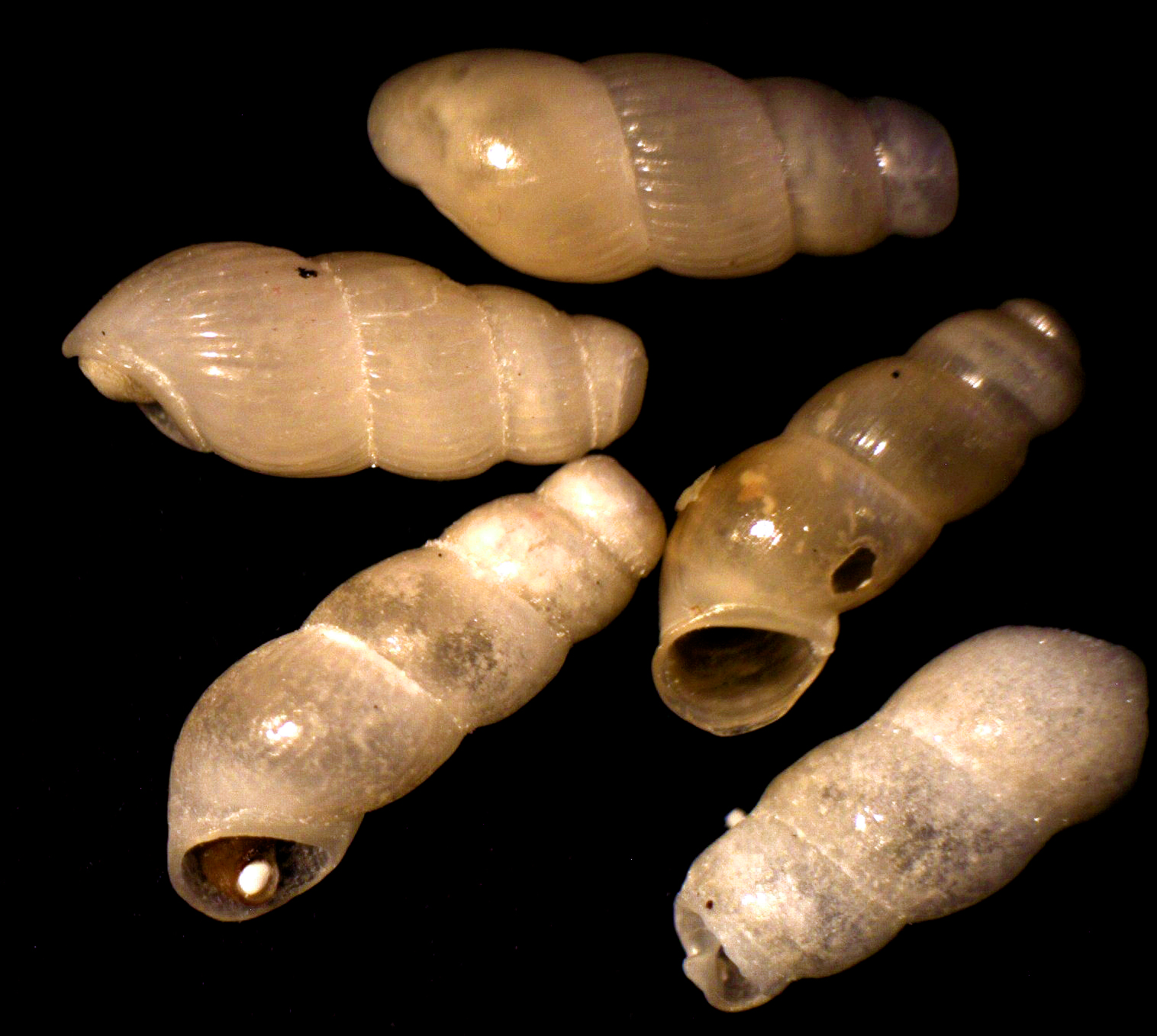
Shells of Truncatella vincentiana

The genus Truncatella was erected by Antoine Risso (Risso, 1826) for T. costulata (now T. subcylindrica), which is the type species for this genus.

There are several genera within the Truncatellidae, but the eponymous genus Truncatella is the largest (in terms of number of species); other genera in the family are Geomelania, Taheitia, and Blandiella.

There are approximately 30 species in the genus Truncatella, including:

- † Truncatella arcicostata H.-J. Wang, 1982
- Truncatella avenacea Garrett, 1887
- Truncatella bahamensis Clench and Turner, 1948
- Truncatella bairdiana C. B. Adams, 1852
- Truncatella barbadensis L. Pfeiffer, 1857
- Truncatella brazieri Cox, 1868
- Truncatella californica Pfeiffer, 1857 - California truncatella
- Truncatella caribaeensis Reeve, 1842 - Caribbean truncatella
- Truncatella clathrus Lowe, 1832
- † Truncatella crassolabia H.-Z. Pan, 1982
- Truncatella diaphana Gassies, 1869
- † Truncatella directa Y.-T. Li, 1988
- Truncatella granum Garrett, 1872
- Truncatella guerinii Villa & Villa, 1841
- † Truncatella hermitei Bardin, 1879
- † Truncatella hubeiensis Y.-T. Li, 1987
- † Truncatella jiaozhouensis T. Yu, Salvador, H. Wang, Y. Fang, Neubauer, S. Li, H. Zang & X. Wan, 2021
- Truncatella marginata Küster, 1855
- Truncatella oagariensis (Kuroda, 1960)
- † Truncatella obliqua H.-Z. Pan, 1982
- Truncatella obscura Morelet, 1882
- † Truncatella parva Y.-T. Li, 1988
- Truncatella pfeifferi Martens, 1860
- Truncatella quadrasi Möllendorff, 1893
- † Truncatella rabora H.-Z. Pan, 1982
- Truncatella reclusa (Guppy, 1871)
- Truncatella rostrata Gould, 1848
- Truncatella rustica Mousson, 1865
- † Truncatella sanshuiensis W. Yü & X.-Q. Zhang, 1982
- Truncatella scalarina Cox, 1867
- Truncatella scalaris (Michaud, 1830) - ladder truncatella
- Truncatella semperi Kobelt, 1884
- † Truncatella sinensis Y.-T. Li, 1988
- Truncatella stimpsonii Stearns, 1872: synonym of Truncatella californica L. Pfeiffer, 1857
- Truncatella subcylindrica (Linnaeus, 1767)
- Truncatella teres (Pfeiffer, 1857): synonym of Truncatella marginata Küster, 1855
- Truncatella thaanumi Clench & Turner, 1948
- Truncatella truncatula J.P.R. Draparnaud, 1801: synonym of Truncatella subcylindrica (C. Linnaeus, 1767)
- Truncatella vincentiana Cotton, 1942
- † Truncatella wattebledi Benoist, 1878
- † Truncatella xuanchengensis H.-Z. Pan, 1982
- Truncatella yorkensis (Cox, 1868): synonym of Truncatella guerinii A. Villa & J. B. Villa, 1841

== Synonyms ==
- † Truncatella antediluviana Deshayes, 1861: synonym of † Bouryia antediluviana (Deshayes, 1861) (superseded combination)
- Truncatella arcasiana Crosse, 1868: synonym of Taheitia arcasiana (Crosse, 1868)(original combination)
- Truncatella atomus Philippi, 1841: synonym of Omalogyra atomus (Philippi, 1841) (original combination)
- Truncatella aurantia A. Gould, 1847: synonym of Truncatella guerinii A. Villa & J. B. Villa, 1841
- † Truncatella bezanconi Cossmann, 1892: synonym of † Murchisonella bezanconi (Cossmann, 1892) (superseded combination)
- Truncatella bilabiata L. Pfeiffer, 1840: synonym of Truncatella pulchella L. Pfeiffer, 1839 (junior subjective synonym)
- Truncatella capillacea L. Pfeiffer, 1859: synonym of Truncatella pulchella L. Pfeiffer, 1839
- Truncatella caribaeensis Reeve, 1842, sensu Clench & Turner, 1948: synonym of Truncatella pulchella L. Pfeiffer, 1839 (misidentification)
- Truncatella ceylanica Pfeiffer, 1857: synonym of Truncatella marginata Küster, 1855 (junior synonym)
- Truncatella concinna Pease, 1871: synonym of Truncatella guerinii A. Villa & J. B. Villa, 1841
- † Truncatella costata Cossmann, 1895: synonym of Truncatella wattebledi Benoist, 1878 (invalid; not L. Pfeiffer 1839)
- Truncatella costata L. Pfeiffer, 1839: synonym of Truncatella scalaris (Michaud, 1830)
- Truncatella costellifera Pease, 1871: synonym of Truncatella rustica Mousson, 1865
- Truncatella costulata Risso, 1826: synonym of Truncatella subcylindrica (Linnaeus, 1767)
- Truncatella cristata Crosse, 1868: synonym of Truncatella guerinii A. Villa & J. B. Villa, 1841
- Truncatella cumingii C. B. Adams, 1845: synonym of Truncatella scalaris (Michaud, 1830)
- † Truncatella cylindrata Briart & Cornet, 1887: synonym of † Bouryia cylindrata (Briart & Cornet, 1887) (superseded combination)
- Truncatella debilis Mousson, 1873: synonym of Truncatella subcylindrica (Linnaeus, 1767)
- Truncatella desnoyersii (Payraudeau, 1826): synonym of Truncatella subcylindrica (Linnaeus, 1767)
- † Truncatella distensa Cossmann, 1888: synonym of † Bouryia distensa (Cossmann, 1888) (superseded combination)
- Truncatella elongata L. Pfeiffer, 1856: synonym of Geomelania elongata (L. Pfeiffer, 1856)
- Truncatella fasciata Tapparone Canefri, 1886: synonym of Truncatella guerinii A. Villa & J. B. Villa, 1841
- Truncatella ferruginea (Cox, 1868): synonym of Truncatella guerinii A. Villa & J. B. Villa, 1841
- Truncatella filicosta Poey, 1858: synonym of Geomelania elongata (L. Pfeiffer, 1856)
- Truncatella floridana Hubricht, 1983: synonym of Truncatella pulchella L. Pfeiffer, 1839
- Truncatella funiculus Mousson, 1870: synonym of Taheitia funiculus (Mousson, 1870) (original combination)
- Truncatella fusca Philippi, 1841: synonym of Setia fusca (Philippi, 1841)
- Truncatella futunaensis Mousson, 1871: synonym of Truncatella rustica Mousson, 1865 (junior subjective synonym)
- Truncatella gracilenta W. G. Binney, 1858: synonym of Truncatella californica L. Pfeiffer, 1857 (nomen nudum)
- Truncatella gracilenta E. A. Smith, 1897: synonym of Taheitia gracilenta (E. A. Smith, 1897) (original combination)
- Truncatella haitensis Weinland, 1876: synonym of Geomelania haitensis (Weinland, 1876) (original combination)
- Truncatella japonica Pilsbry & Y. Hirase, 1905: synonym of Truncatella pfeifferi E. von Martens, 1861 (junior synonym)
- Truncatella juliae de Folin, 1872: synonym of Parthenina juliae (de Folin, 1872) (original combination)
- Truncatella kiusiuensis Pilsbry, 1902: synonym of Truncatella pfeifferi E. von Martens, 1861 (junior synonym)
- Truncatella labiosa Souverbie, 1862: synonym of Truncatella teres L. Pfeiffer, 1857: synonym of Truncatella marginata Küster, 1855 (junior subjective synonym)
- Truncatella laevigata Risso, 1826: synonym of Truncatella subcylindrica (Linnaeus, 1767)
- Truncatella laevissima Kuroda, 1956: synonym of Truncatella pfeifferi E. von Martens, 1861
- Truncatella lirata Poey, 1858: synonym of Geomelania lirata (Poey, 1858)
- Truncatella lowei Shuttleworth, 1852: synonym of Truncatella subcylindrica (Linnaeus, 1767)
- Truncatella lubrica Held, 1847: synonym of Platyla polita (W. Hartmann, 1840) (junior synonym)
- Truncatella manchurica (A. Adams, 1861): synonym of Cecina manchurica A. Adams, 1861 (superseded combination)
- Truncatella mariannarum Quadras & Möllendorff, 1894: synonym of Taheitia mariannarum (Quadras & Möllendorff, 1894) (original combination)
- Truncatella micra Tenison Woods, 1878: synonym of Truncatella scalarina Cox, 1867 (junior synonym)
- Truncatella microlena Monterosato, 1878: synonym of Truncatella subcylindrica (Linnaeus, 1767)
- † Truncatella minor Briart & Cornet, 1887: synonym of † Bouryia minor (Briart & Cornet, 1887) (superseded combination)
- Truncatella minuscula de Folin, 1875: synonym of Graphis albida (Kanmacher, 1798) (synonym)
- Truncatella modesta C. B. Adams, 1851: synonym of Turbonilla rixtae De Jong & Coomans, 1988 (junior homonym)
- Truncatella montagui R. T. Lowe, 1832: synonym of Truncatella subcylindrica (Linnaeus, 1767)
- Truncatella pacifica Pease, 1868: synonym of Truncatella guerinii A. Villa & J. B. Villa, 1841
- † Truncatella parisiensis Deshayes, 1861: synonym of † Bouryia parisiensis (Deshayes, 1861)
- Truncatella pulchella Pfeiffer, 1839 - beautiful truncatella - synonyms: Truncatella bilabiata, Truncatella bilabiata bilabiata, Truncatella bilabiata barbadensis.
- Truncatella pellucida Dohrn, 1860: synonym of Truncatella marginata f. pellucida Dohrn, 1860: synonym of Truncatella marginata Küster, 1855
- Truncatella porrecta A. Gould, 1847: synonym of Taheitia porrecta (A. Gould, 1847) (original combination)
- Truncatella princeps Dohrn, 1866: synonym of Truncatella rostrata A. Gould, 1847 (junior synonym)
- Truncatella punctata Monterosato, 1878: synonym of Truncatella subcylindrica (Linnaeus, 1767)
- Truncatella regina Hubricht, 1983: synonym of Truncatella clathrus R. T. Lowe, 1832
- Truncatella scalariformis C. B. Adams, 1845: synonym of Truncatella scalaris (Michaud, 1830)
- Truncatella scalariformis Reeve, 1842: synonym of Taheitia scalariformis (Reeve, 1842) (original combination)
- Truncatella schneideri I. Rensch, 1937: synonym of Taheitia schneideri (Rensch, 1937)
- Truncatella semicostulata Jickeli, 1874: synonym of Truncatella marginata f. pellucida Dohrn, 1860: synonym of Truncatella marginata Küster, 1855
- Truncatella stimpsonii Stearns, 1872: synonym of Truncatella californica L. Pfeiffer, 1857
- Truncatella striata Reeve, 1842: synonym of Coxiella striata (Reeve, 1842) (original combination)
- Truncatella striatula Menke, 1843: synonym of Coxiella striatula (Menke, 1843) (original combination)
- Truncatella subauriculata Quadras & Möllendorff, 1894: synonym of Taheitia mariannarum (Quadras & Möllendorff, 1894) (junior synonym)
- Truncatella succinea C. B. Adams, 1845: synonym of Truncatella caribaeensis Reeve, 1842 (junior subjective synonym)
- Truncatella tatarica Schrenck, 1867: synonym of Cecina tatarica (Schrenck, 1867) (original rank)
- Truncatella teres L. Pfeiffer, 1857: synonym of Truncatella marginata Küster, 1855
- Truncatella truncatula (Draparnaud, 1801): synonym of Truncatella subcylindrica (Linnaeus, 1767) (junior synonym)
- Truncatella turricula Mousson, 1870: synonym of Taheitia turricula (Mousson, 1870) (original combination)
- Truncatella ultima I. Rensch, 1937: synonym of Taheitia ultima (I. Rensch, 1937) (original combination)
- Truncatella valida L. Pfeiffer, 1846: synonym of Truncatella guerinii A. Villa & J. B. Villa, 1841 (junior synonym)
- Truncatella ventricosa Reeve, 1842: synonym of Tomichia ventricosa (Reeve, 1842) (original combination)
- Truncatella vitiana A. Gould, 1847: synonym of Truncatella guerinii A. Villa & J. B. Villa, 1841
- Truncatella wallacei H. Adams, 1865: synonym of Taheitia wallacei (H. Adams, 1865) (original combination)
- † Truncatella weixianensis Youluo, 1978 (unavailable name)
- Truncatella wrighti L. Pfeiffer, 1862: synonym of Geomelania lirata (Poey, 1858)
- Truncatella yorkensis Cox, 1868: synonym of Truncatella guerinii A. Villa & J. B. Villa, 1841
