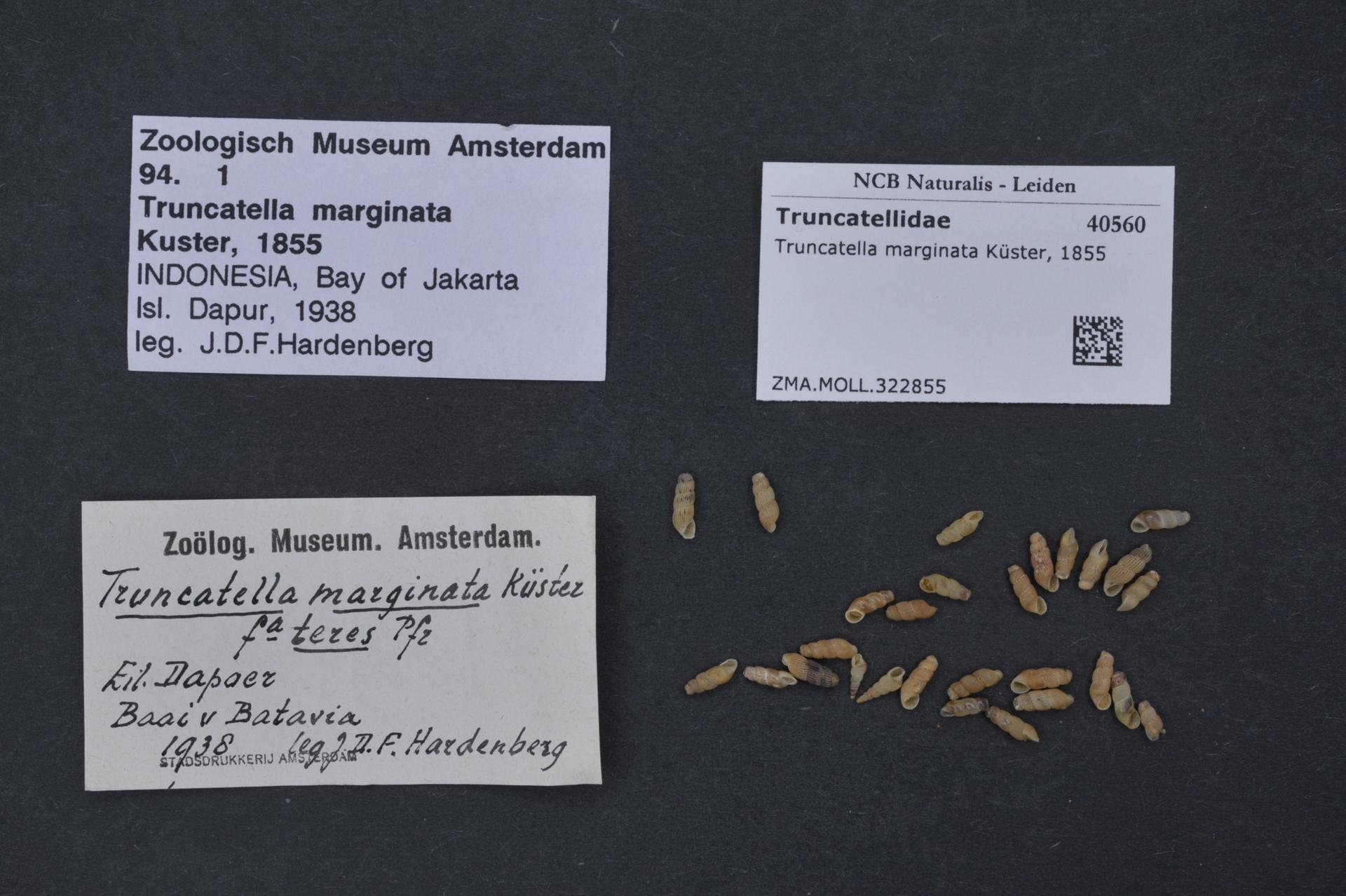

Scientific classification
- Kingdom: Animalia
- Phylum: Mollusca
- Class: Gastropoda
- Subclass: Caenogastropoda
- Order: Littorinimorpha
- Family: Truncatellidae
- Genus: Truncatella
- Species: T. marginata

Binomial name
- Truncatella marginata Küster, 1855

Synonyms
- Truncatella ceylanica (L. Pfeiffer, 1857); Truncatella teres (L. Pfeiffer, 1857); Truncatella pellucida (Dohrn, 1860); Truncatella labiosa (Souverbie, 1862); Truncatella semicostulata (Jickeli, 1874)

= Truncatella marginata =

Species of gastropod

Truncatella marginata is a species of a very small somewhat amphibious land snail with a gill and an operculum, a semi-terrestrial gastropod mollusk or micromollusk in the family Truncatellidae, the truncatella snails or looping snails.

== Description ==
T. marginata was first described in 1855 by German malacologist Heinrich Carl Küster.

== Distribution ==
T.marginata is found in countries around the Indian Ocean, including Mauritius, Sri Lanka, Borneo, Malaysia.

== Habitat ==
These tiny snails live in damp habitat (under rotting vegetation) that is very close to the edge of the sea; they can tolerate being washed with saltwater during especially high tides. These snails are sometimes listed as land snails and at other times they are listed as marine snails.
