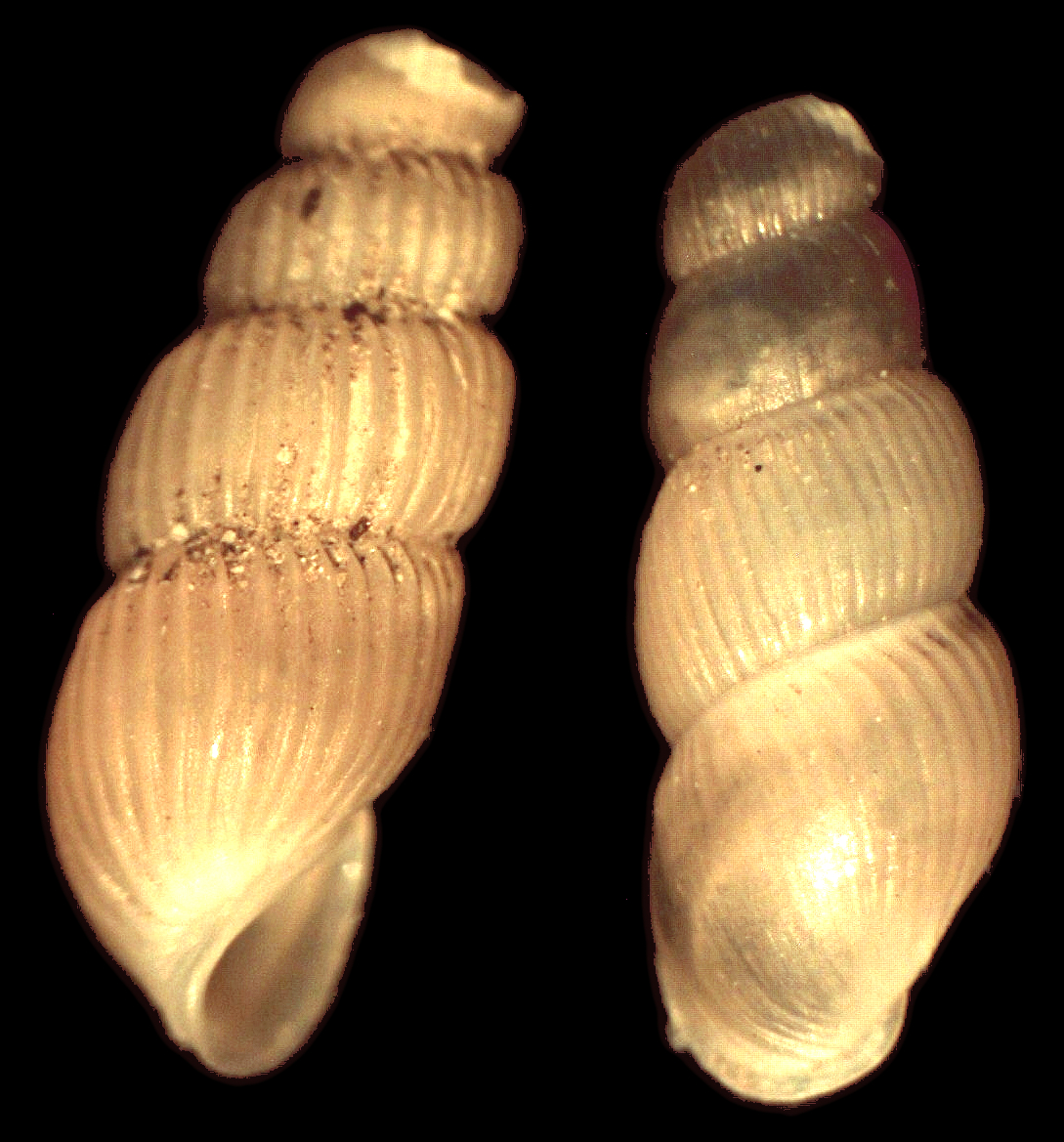
- Two shells of Truncatella scalarina

Scientific classification
- Kingdom: Animalia
- Phylum: Mollusca
- Class: Gastropoda
- Subclass: Caenogastropoda
- Order: Littorinimorpha
- Family: Truncatellidae
- Genus: Truncatella
- Species: T. scalarina

Binomial name
- Truncatella scalarina Cox, 1867

Synonyms
- Margarita (Minolia) tasmanica Tenison-Woods, 1877; Minolia tasmanica Pilsbry, 1889

= Truncatella scalarina =

Species of gastropod

Truncatella scalarina is a species of very small land snail that lives next to seawater, a gastropod mollusk or micromollusk in the family Truncatellidae.

== Distribution and habitat ==
This small snail is endemic to southeastern Australia: New South Wales and Tasmania. It lives at and above the high tide level, in and under debris.

== Description ==
The average shell length is 8 mm.
