= Truncatella clathrus =

Scientific classification
- Kingdom: Animalia
- Phylum: Mollusca
- Class: Gastropoda
- Subclass: Caenogastropoda
- Order: Littorinimorpha
- Family: Truncatellidae
- Genus: Truncatella
- Species: T. clathrus

Binomial name
- Truncatella clathrus Lowe, 1832

Species of gastropod

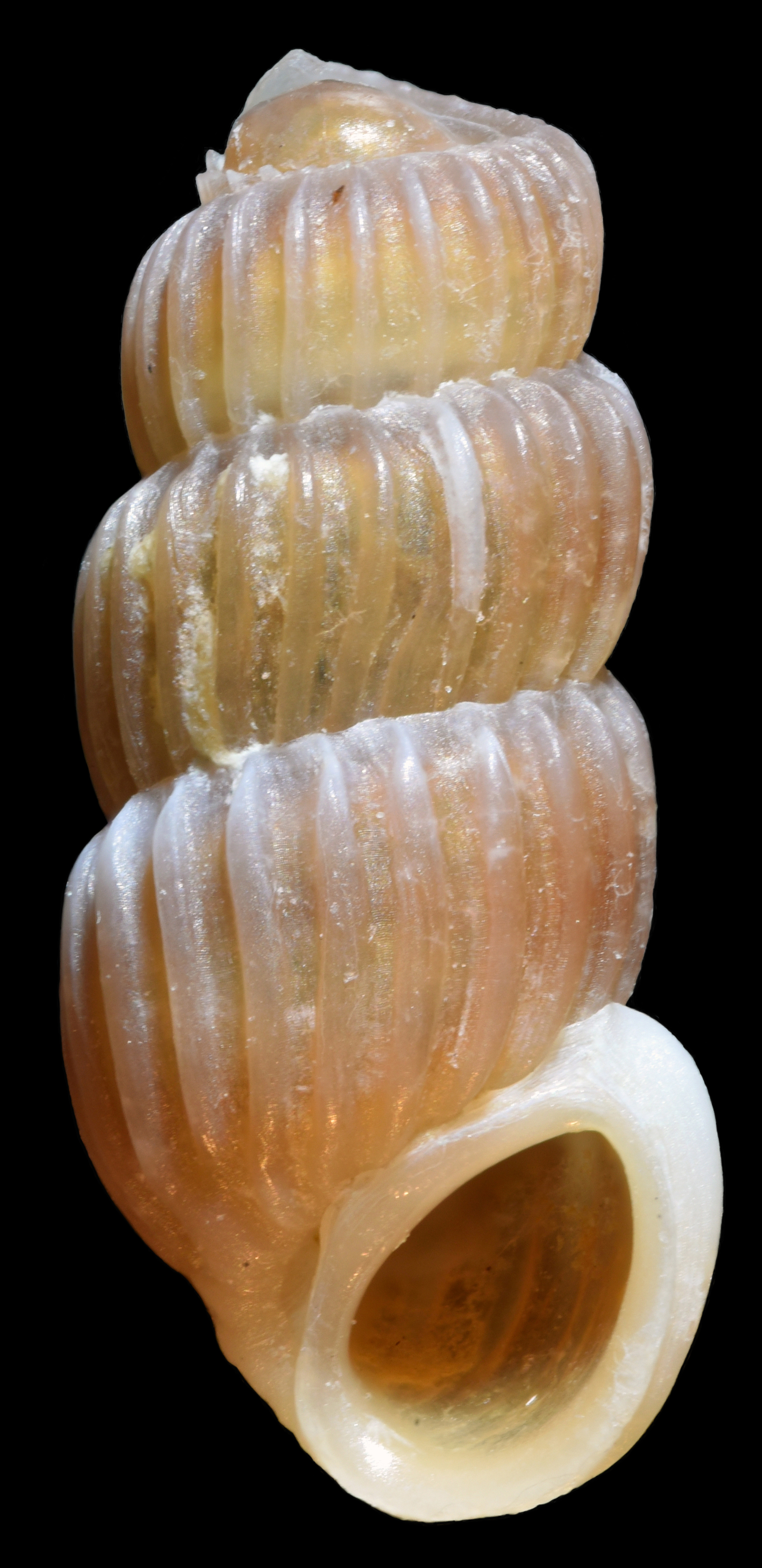
Apertural view of a shell of Truncatella clathrus

Truncatella clathrus is a species of very small somewhat amphibious land snail with a gill and an operculum, a semi-terrestrial gastropod mollusk or micromollusk in the family Truncatellidae, the truncatella snails or looping snails. These tiny snails live in damp habitat (under rotting vegetation) that is very close to the edge of the sea; they can tolerate being washed with saltwater during especially high tides. These snails are sometimes listed as land snails and at other times they are listed as marine snails.

== Distribution ==
Tis species occurs in coastal areas including the Gulf of Mexico.

== Description ==
The maximum recorded shell length is 8 mm.

== Habitat ==
The minimum recorded depth for this species is 0 m; the maximum recorded depth is 0 m.
