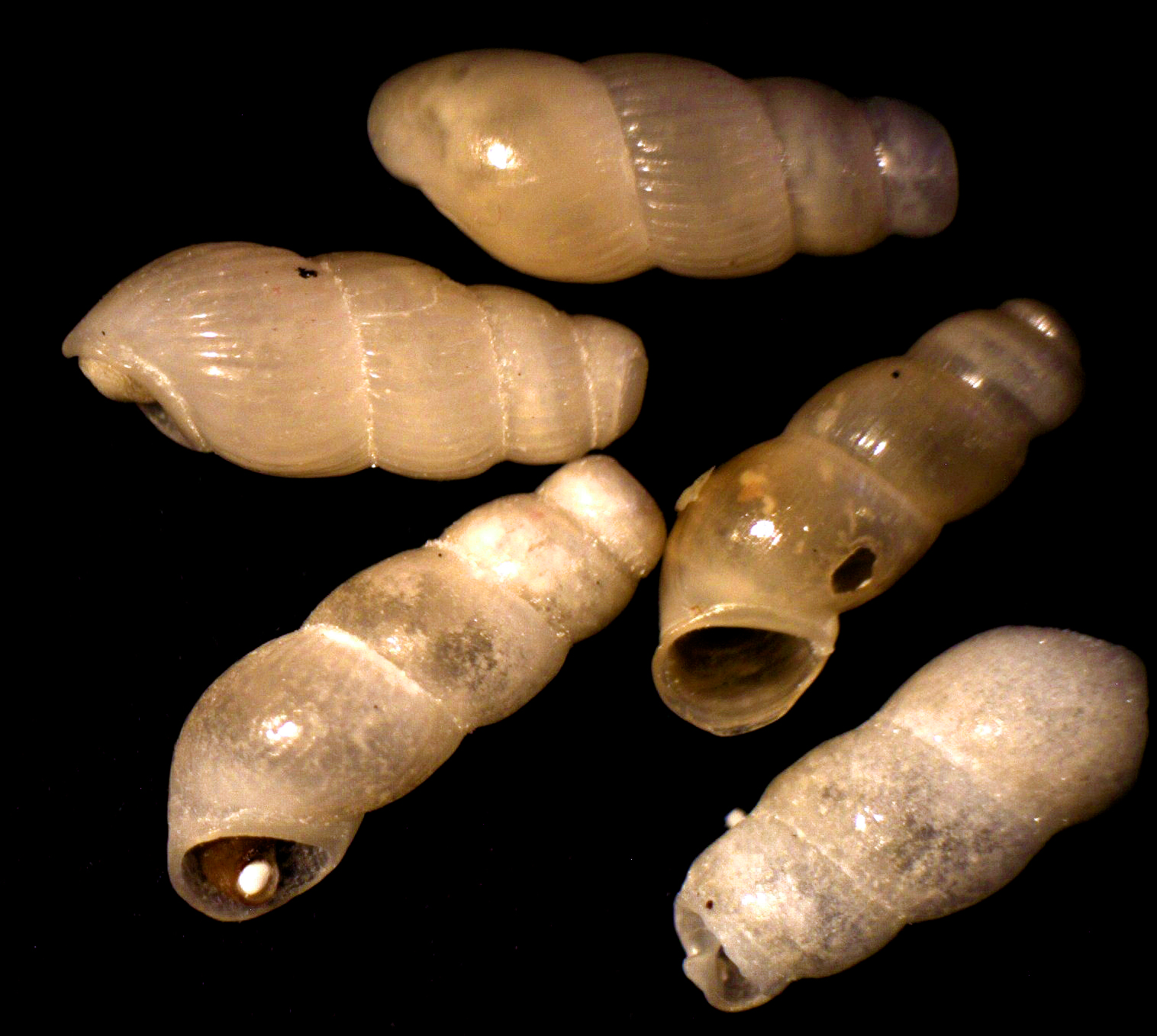
- Five beach-worn shells of Truncatella vincentiana from South Australia

Scientific classification
- Kingdom: Animalia
- Phylum: Mollusca
- Class: Gastropoda
- Subclass: Caenogastropoda
- Order: Littorinimorpha
- Family: Truncatellidae
- Genus: Truncatella
- Species: T. vincentiana

Binomial name
- Truncatella vincentiana Cotton, 1942

= Truncatella vincentiana =

Species of gastropod

Truncatella vincentiana is a species of very small land snail that lives next to saltwater, a gastropod mollusk or micromollusk in the family Truncatellidae.

== Distribution and habitat ==
This small snail is endemic to southern and southwestern Australia, including Tasmania. It lives in the intertidal zone, on mud flats.

== Description ==
The average shell length is 5 mm.
