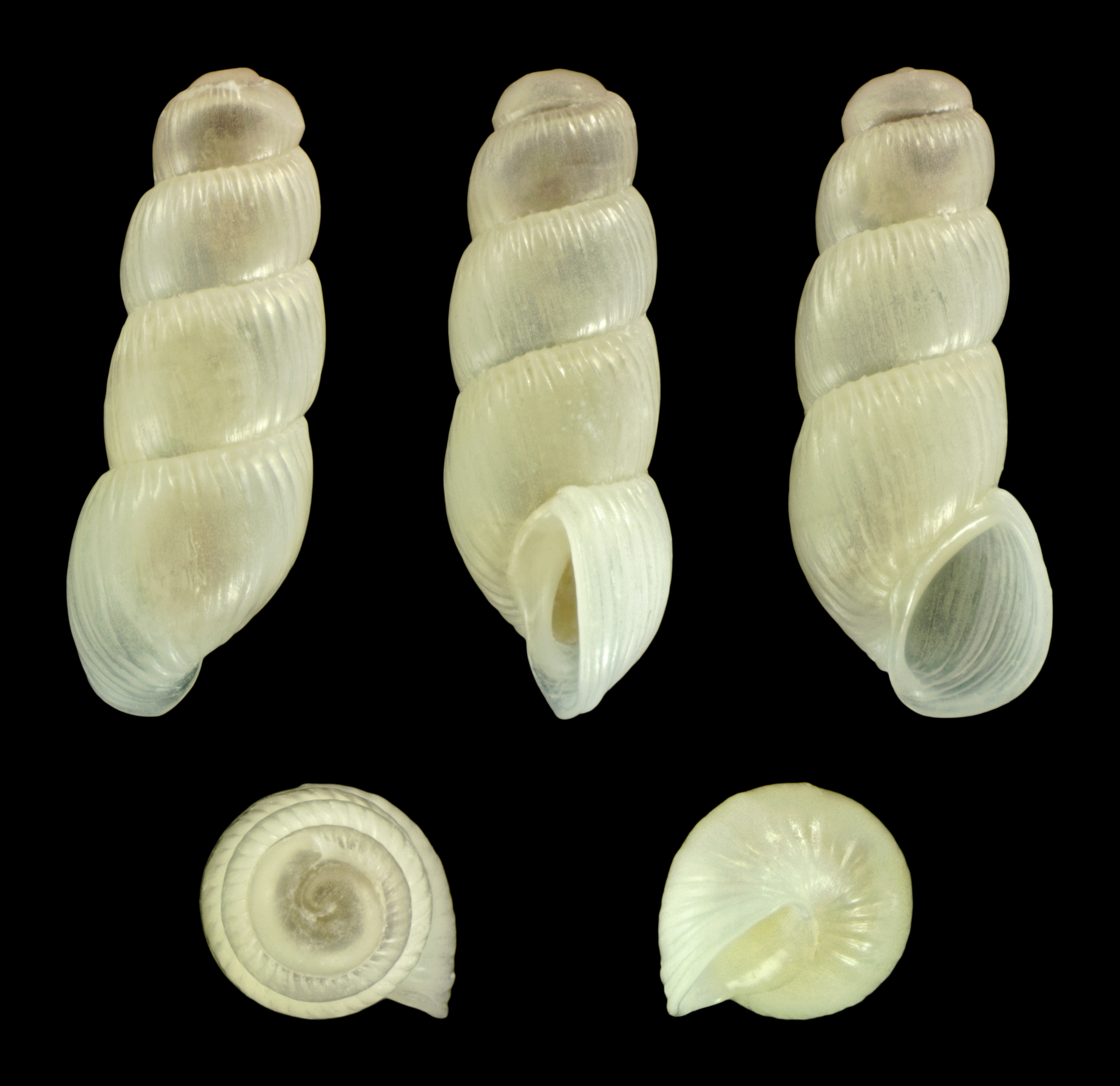

Scientific classification
- Kingdom: Animalia
- Phylum: Mollusca
- Class: Gastropoda
- Subclass: Caenogastropoda
- Order: Littorinimorpha
- Family: Truncatellidae
- Genus: Truncatella
- Species: T. caribaeensis

Binomial name
- Truncatella caribaeensis Reeve, 1842

= Truncatella caribaeensis =

Species of gastropod

Truncatella caribaeensis is a species of a very small somewhat amphibious land snail with a gill and an operculum, a semi-terrestrial gastropod mollusk or micromollusk in the family Truncatellidae, the truncatella snails or looping snails. These tiny snails live in damp habitat (under rotting vegetation) that is very close to the edge of the sea; they can tolerate being washed with saltwater during especially high tides. These snails are sometimes listed as land snails and at other times they are listed as marine snails.

== Distribution ==
The distribution of Truncatella caribaeensis includes: Aruba, Belize, Bonaire, Caribbean Sea, Cayman Islands, Colombia, Cuba, Curaçao, Gulf of Mexico, Hispaniola, Jamaica, Lesser Antilles, Mexico, Puerto Rico and San Andres.

== Description ==
The maximum recorded shell length is 9 mm.

== Habitat ==
Minimum recorded depth is 0 m. Maximum recorded depth is 1.5 m.
