= Taheitia alata =

Conservation status
- Data Deficient (IUCN 2.3)

Scientific classification
- Kingdom: Animalia
- Phylum: Mollusca
- Class: Gastropoda
- Subclass: Caenogastropoda
- Order: Littorinimorpha
- Family: Truncatellidae
- Genus: Taheitia
- Species: T. alata

Binomial name
- Taheitia alata (Guadras and Moellendorff, 1894)

Species of gastropod

Taheitia alata is a species of very small land snail that has an operculum and lives very near saltwater, a maritime terrestrial gastropod mollusk in the family Truncatellidae. This species is endemic to Guam.

== See also ==
List of land snails of the Mariana Islands
