= Truncatella guerinii =

- Truncatella guerinii Villa & Villa, 1841

Conservation status
- Least Concern (IUCN 3.1)

Scientific classification
- Kingdom: Animalia
- Phylum: Mollusca
- Class: Gastropoda
- Subclass: Caenogastropoda
- Order: Littorinimorpha
- Family: Truncatellidae
- Genus: Truncatella
- Species: T. guerinii

Binomial name
- Truncatella guerinii A. & J. Villa, 1841

Synonyms
- Truncatella (Taheitia) amamiensis Kuroda & Habe, 1961; Truncatella aurantia A. Gould, 1847; Truncatella concinna Pease, 1871; Truncatella cristata Crosse, 1868 d; Truncatella fasciata Tapparone Canefri, 1886; Truncatella ferruginea Cox, 1868; Truncatella pacifica Pease, 1868; Truncatella valida L. Pfeiffer, 1846 (junior synonym); Truncatella vitiana A. Gould, 1847; Truncatella yorkensis Cox, 1868

Species of gastropod

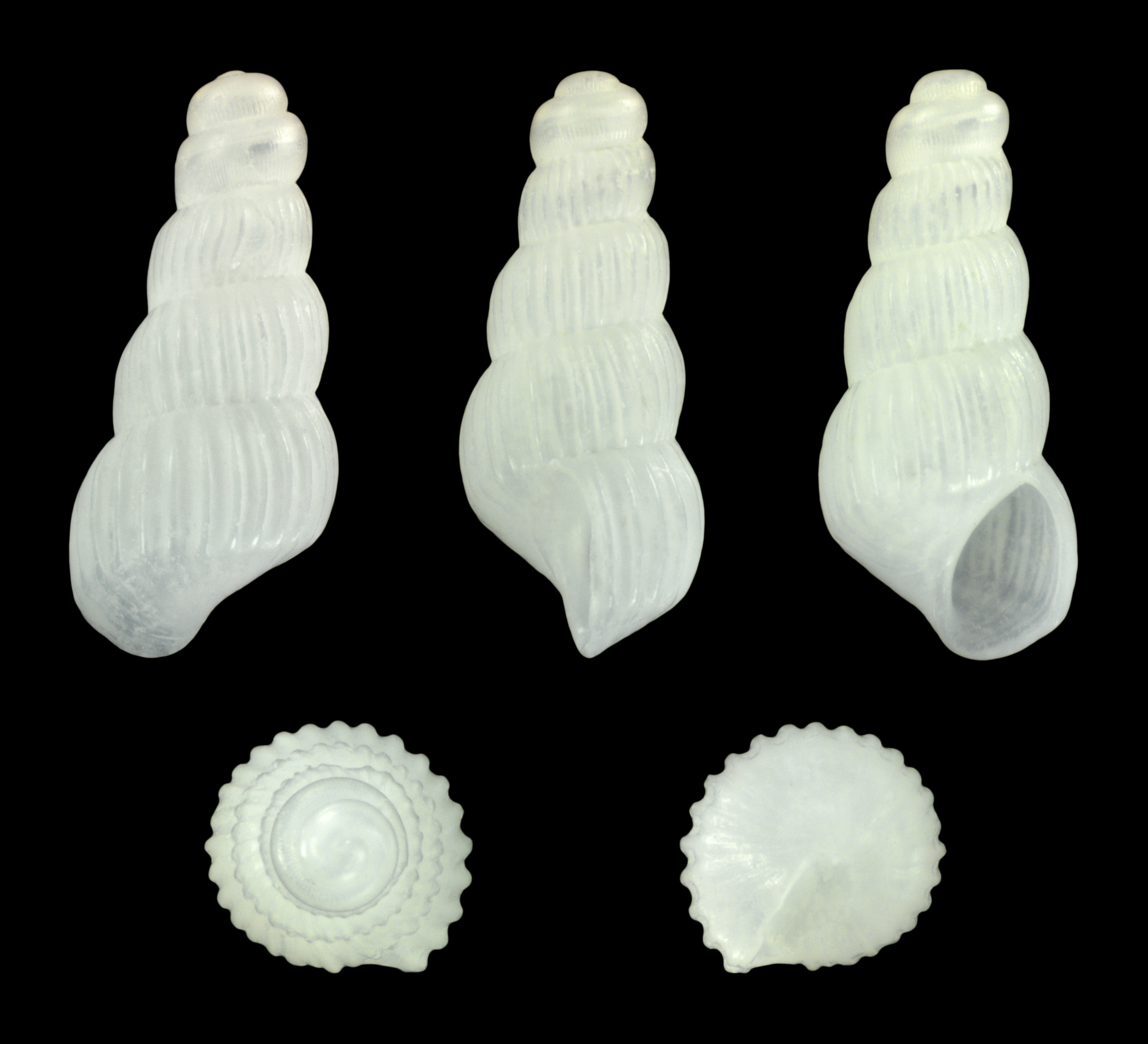
Juvenile

Truncatella guerinii is a species of very small land snail that lives at the edge of the sea, a gastropod mollusk in the family Truncatellidae. This species was described in 1841 by Antonio Villa and J. Battista Villa. The type specimen for this species was collected on Réunion Island.

== Description ==
The shell of T. guerinii is small, solid, and rather cylindrical. Their shell is also sculptured with numerous axial ribs, with about 30 ribs on their body whorl. Their total shell height is up to 10 mm. Their earliest apical whorls are smooth, with the sculpture of their axial ribs gradually becoming more defined. The apical whorls of mature individuals' shells are typically truncated. Their shell opening is egg-shaped. Their peristome is complete, going all the way around the shell opening. Their peristome is somewhat thickened, with the outer lip slightly flared in mature specimens. Their umbilicus is closed. Their shell colour is a pale cream to light reddish-brown.

== Distribution ==
This species has a wide distribution in the Indo-Pacific region. examples have been collected in Japan, Pratas Island, Taiwan, the Philippines, Thailand, Micronesia, New Caledonia; also off Madagascar.

== Habitat ==
T. guerinii are found on beaches, coastal cliffs, and in coastal woodlands. They are usually abundant in vegetation and leaf litter near the seashore, and under rocks and debris at the supralittoral zone.
