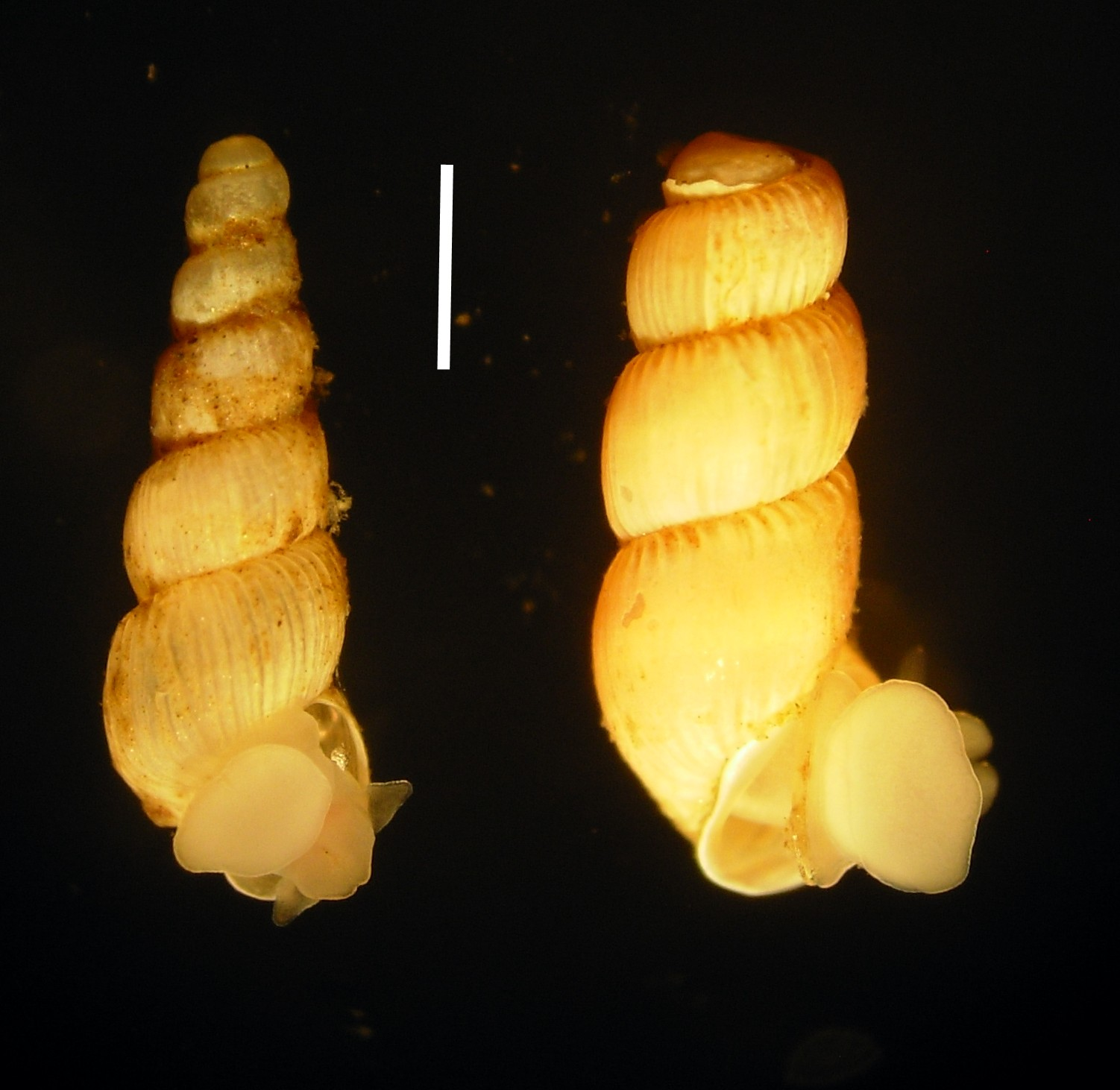
- Two live individuals of Truncatella subcylindrica: a juvenile on the left, and an adult on the right

Scientific classification
- Kingdom: Animalia
- Phylum: Mollusca
- Class: Gastropoda
- Subclass: Caenogastropoda
- Order: Littorinimorpha
- Family: Truncatellidae
- Genus: Truncatella
- Species: T. subcylindrica

Binomial name
- Truncatella subcylindrica (Linnaeus, 1767)

Synonyms
- Albertisia punica Issel, 1880; Cyclostoma concinnum Scacchi, 1836; Cyclostoma truncatulum Draparnaud, 1801; Fidelis theresa Risso, 1826; Glaucothoe montaguana Leach, 1852; Helix subcylindrica Linnaeus, 1767; Paludina desnoyersii Payraudeau, 1826; † Paludina truncatuloides Serres, 1853 (junior subjective synonym); Truncatella costulata Risso, 1826; Truncatella debilis Mousson, 1873; Truncatella desnoyersii (Payraudeau, 1826); Truncatella laevigata Risso, 1826; Truncatella lowei Shuttleworth, 1852; Truncatella microlena Monterosato, 1878; Truncatella montagui R. T. Lowe, 1832; Truncatella punctata Monterosato, 1878; Truncatella subcylindrica var. sublaevigata Bucquoy, Dautzenberg & Dollfus, 1884; Truncatella truncatula (Draparnaud, 1801) (junior synonym); Turbo subtruncatus Montagu, 1803; Turbo truncatus Montagu, 1803; † Zua petraea Locard, 1894 junior subjective synonym; † Zua praecursor Locard, 1894 junior subjective synonym

= Truncatella subcylindrica =

Species of gastropod

Truncatella subcylindrica is a species of small land snail that lives at the edge of the sea. It has gills and an operculum and is gastropod mollusk or micromollusk in the family Truncatellidae.

== Description ==
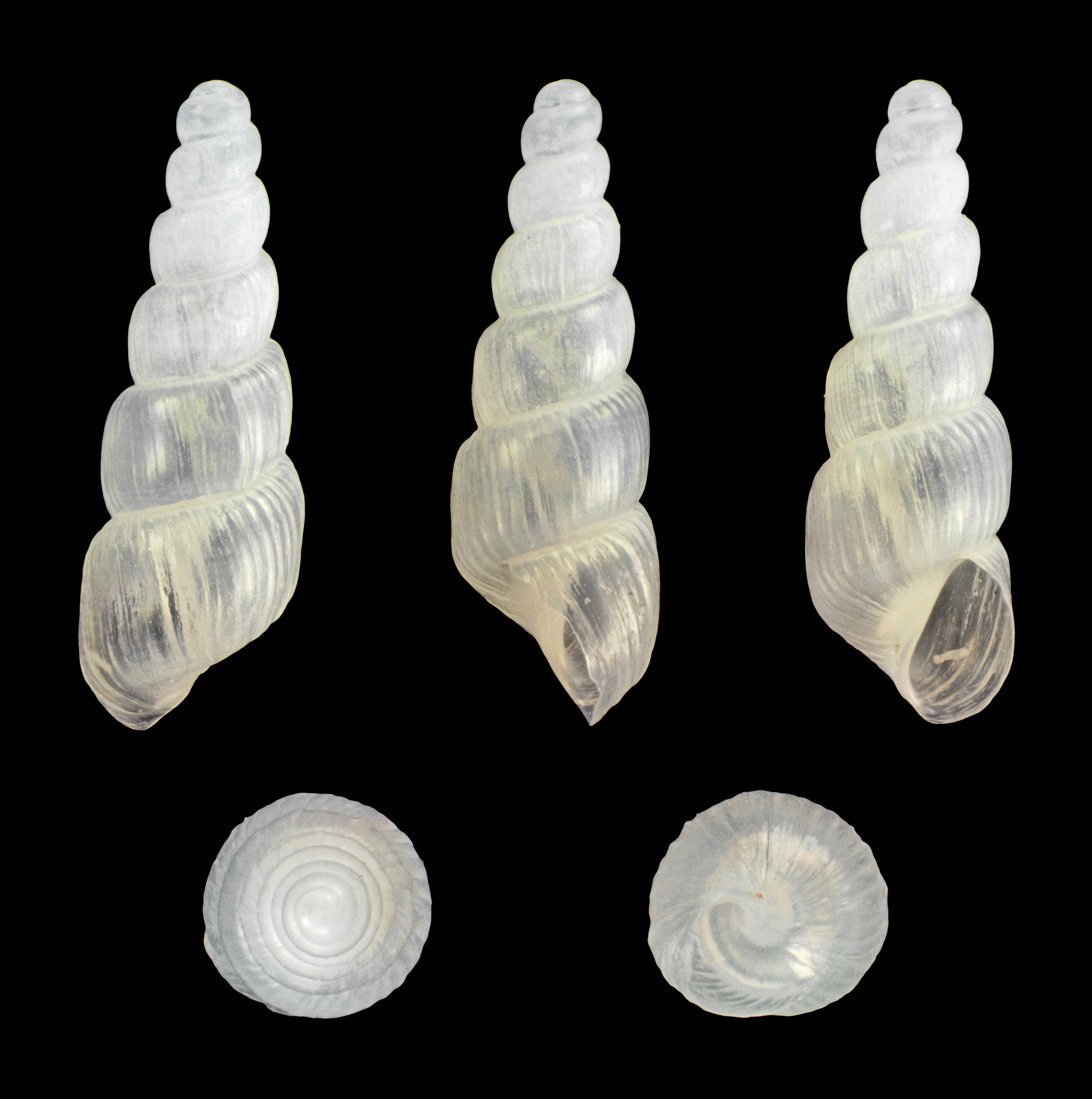
A juvenile shell of Truncatella subcylindrica

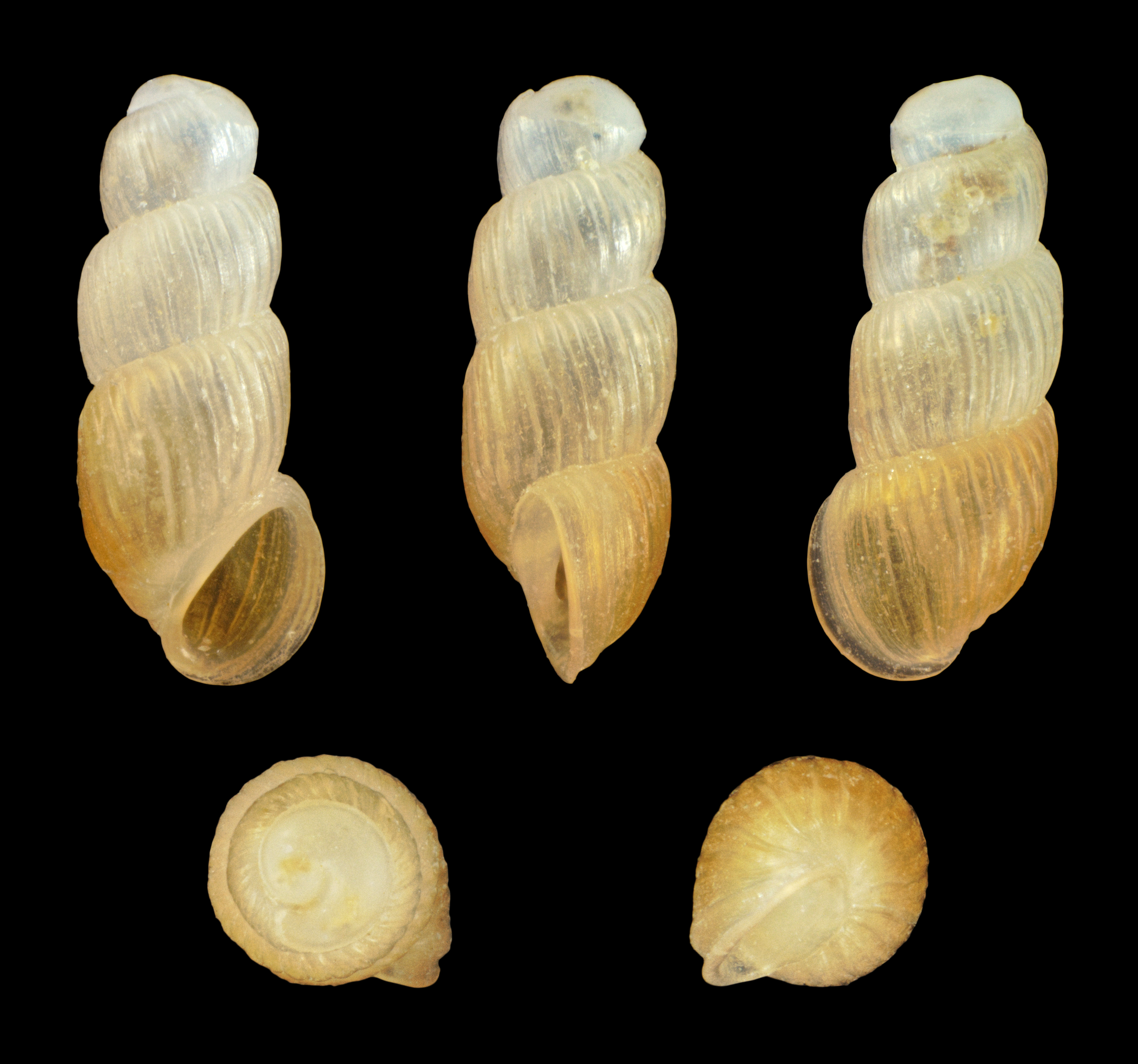
An adult shell of Truncatella subcylindrica

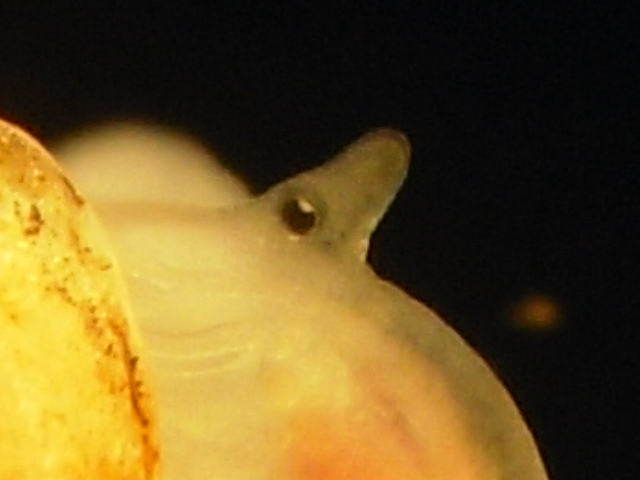
Tentacle of Truncatella subcylindrica with at its base the eye and its white anterior lens.

This species of snail has a shell which is light in color, and which can reach 5 mm in length.

Like all other species in this genus, the shell loses its apical whorls as it grows, giving it a truncated and cylindrical appearance.

== Distribution ==
This snail is native to areas of the northeastern Atlantic coastline, from Morocco and the Mediterranean coast to the Black Sea. This native distribution includes Great Britain.

There are also some early records from the late 1800s for the eastern United States, on the coast of Newport, Rhode Island, where it was presumably introduced.

== Habitat ==
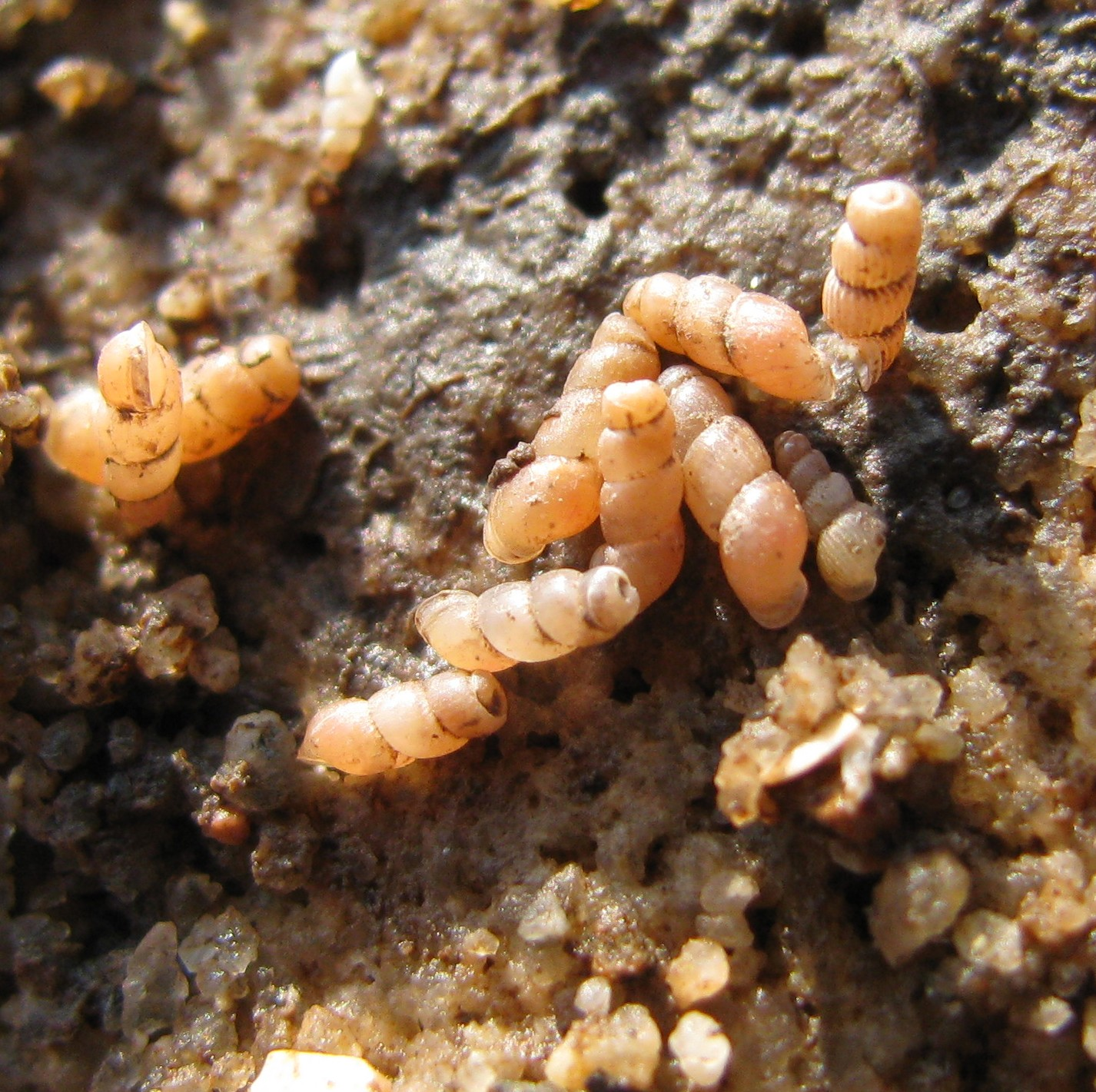
A group of Truncatella subcylindrica underneath a stone.

This species is found in marine coastal environments, near or just above the high tide line on stones and pebbles, fine sediments and decomposing vegetation. It prefers the edge of sheltered waters where the salinity is at 18–40 psu.

== Life cycle ==
The sexes are separate. Fertilized eggs are laid as egg capsules, which are attached to detritus.
