= Taheitia parvula =

Conservation status
- Data Deficient (IUCN 2.3)

Scientific classification
- Kingdom: Animalia
- Phylum: Mollusca
- Class: Gastropoda
- Subclass: Caenogastropoda
- Order: Littorinimorpha
- Family: Truncatellidae
- Genus: Taheitia
- Species: T. parvula

Binomial name
- Taheitia parvula (Quadras & Möllendorff, 1894)

Species of gastropod

Taheitia parvula is a species of very small land snail that has an operculum and lives very near saltwater, a maritime terrestrial gastropod mollusc in the family Truncatellidae. This species is endemic to Guam.

== See also ==
List of land snails of the Mariana Islands
