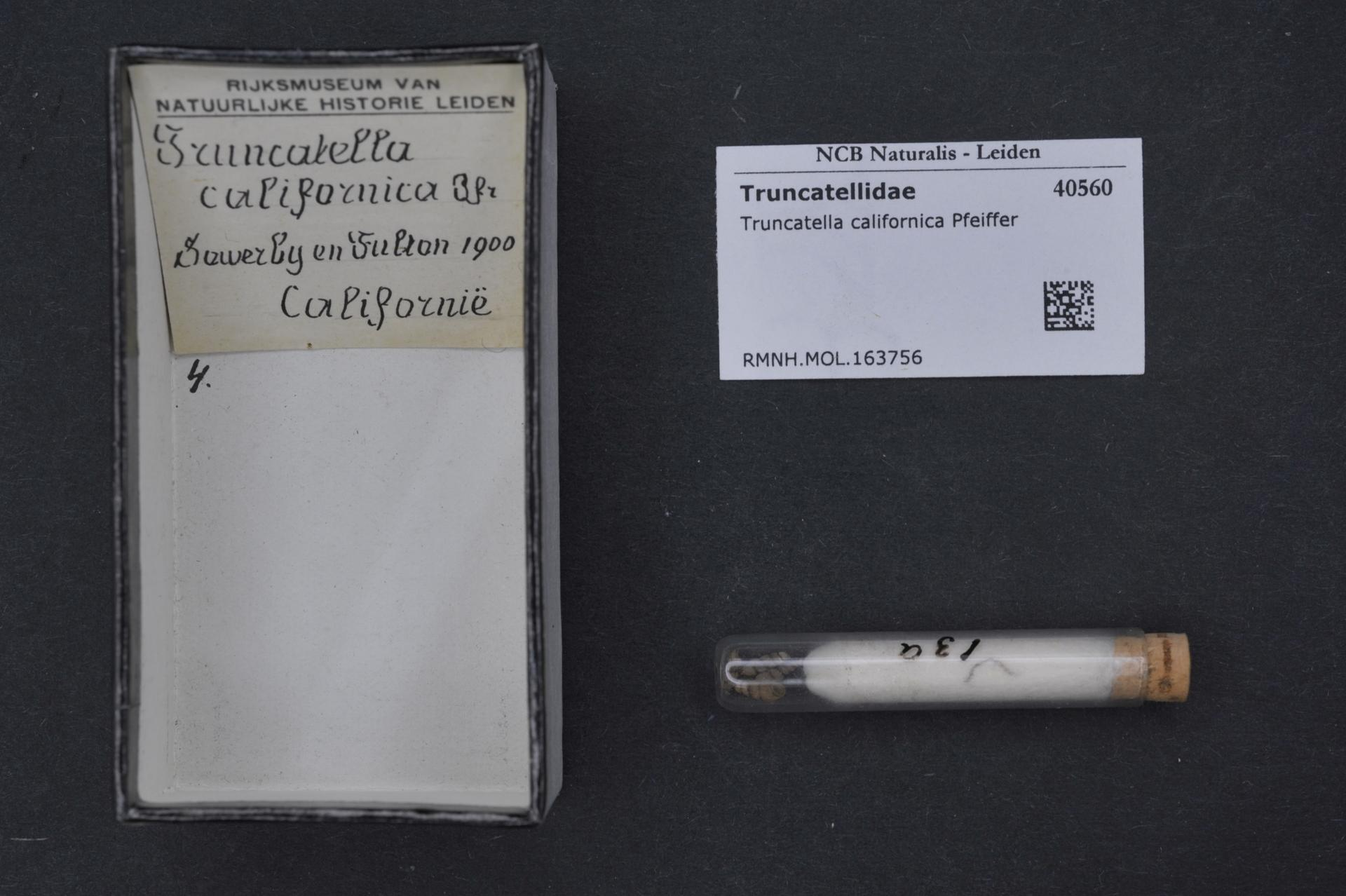
- Truncatella californica Pfeiffer

Scientific classification
- Domain: Eukaryota
- Kingdom: Animalia
- Phylum: Mollusca
- Class: Gastropoda
- Subclass: Caenogastropoda
- Order: Littorinimorpha
- Family: Truncatellidae
- Genus: Truncatella
- Species: T. californica

Binomial name
- Truncatella californica Pfeiffer, 1857

= Truncatella californica =

Species of gastropod

Truncatella californica, common name of the Californian truncatella, is a species of very small amphibious (between sea and land) snail, a gastropod mollusk in the family Truncatellidae.

This species occurs on coastlines in the Eastern Pacific: in California and Baja California, Mexico. The adult size of the shell is 6 millimetres (0.24 in).

== Life Cycle and Mating Behavior ==
Members of the order Neotaenioglossa are mostly gonochoric and broadcast spawners. Embryos develop into planktonic trochophore larvae and later into juvenile veligers before becoming fully grown adults.
