= Nystia =

Nystia Temporal range: Eocene

Scientific classification
- Domain: Eukaryota
- Kingdom: Animalia
- Phylum: Mollusca
- Class: Gastropoda
- Subclass: Caenogastropoda
- Order: Littorinimorpha
- Family: Truncatellidae
- Genus: †Nystia; Tournouer, 1869

Extinct genus of gastropods

Nystia is an extinct genus of fossil freshwater snails, aquatic gastropod molluscs in the family Truncatellidae.

The genus Nystia was previously classified within the Stenothyridae or the Micromelaniidae. It is currently classified within the Truncatellidae according to Kadolsky (1988).

== Distribution ==
The distribution of the genus Nystia includes France and the Czech Republic.

== Species ==
Species in the genus Nystia include:

- Nystia duchasteli (Nyst, 1836) - synonym: Paludina duchasteli Nyst, 1836, type species, from Eocene of France
- Nystia lenoiri
- Nystia rubeschi
