= Taheitia =

Scientific classification
- Kingdom: Animalia
- Phylum: Mollusca
- Class: Gastropoda
- Subclass: Caenogastropoda
- Order: Littorinimorpha
- Family: Truncatellidae
- Subfamily: Truncatellinae
- Genus: Taheitia; Adams, 1863

Genus of gastropods

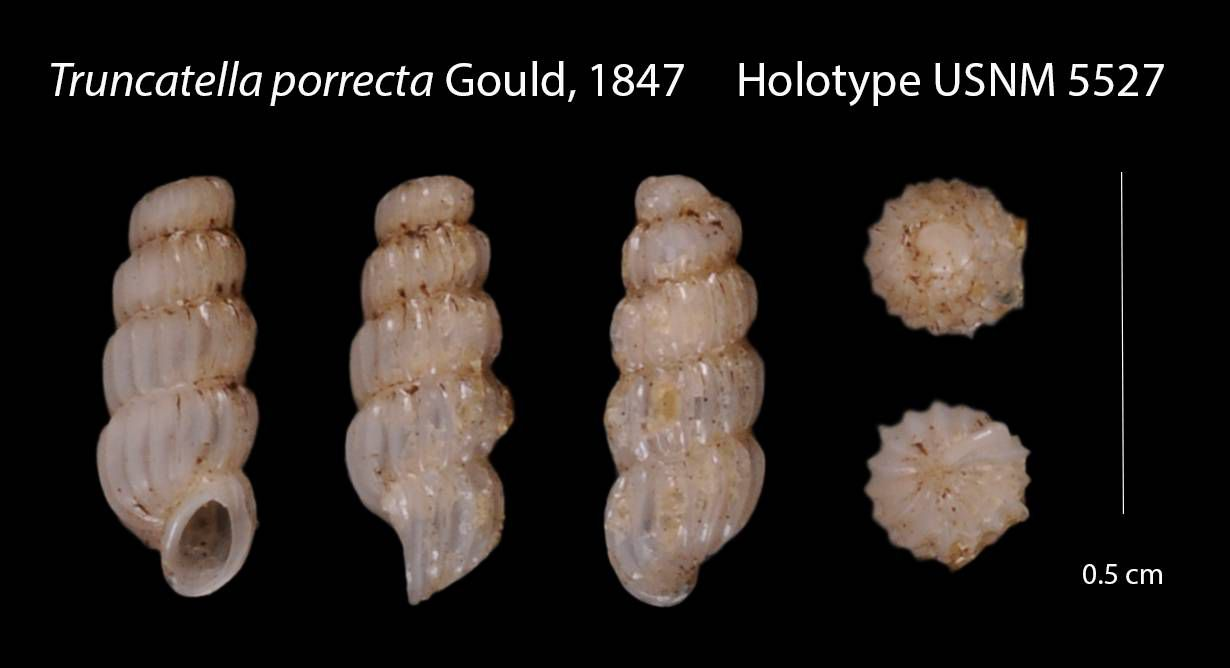
Taheitia porrecta snail

Taheitia is a genus of very small land snails that have an operculum and live near saltwater, maritime terrestrial gastropod mollusks in the family Truncatellidae.

== Species ==
Species within the genus Taheitia include:

- Taheitia alata
- Taheitia elongata (Poey in Pfeiffer, 1856)
- Taheitia filicosta (Gundlach in Poey, 1858)
- Taheitia lamellicosta
- Taheitia lirata (Poey, 1858)
- Taheitia mariannarum
- Taheitia parvula
- Taheitia wrighti (Pfeiffer, 1862)
