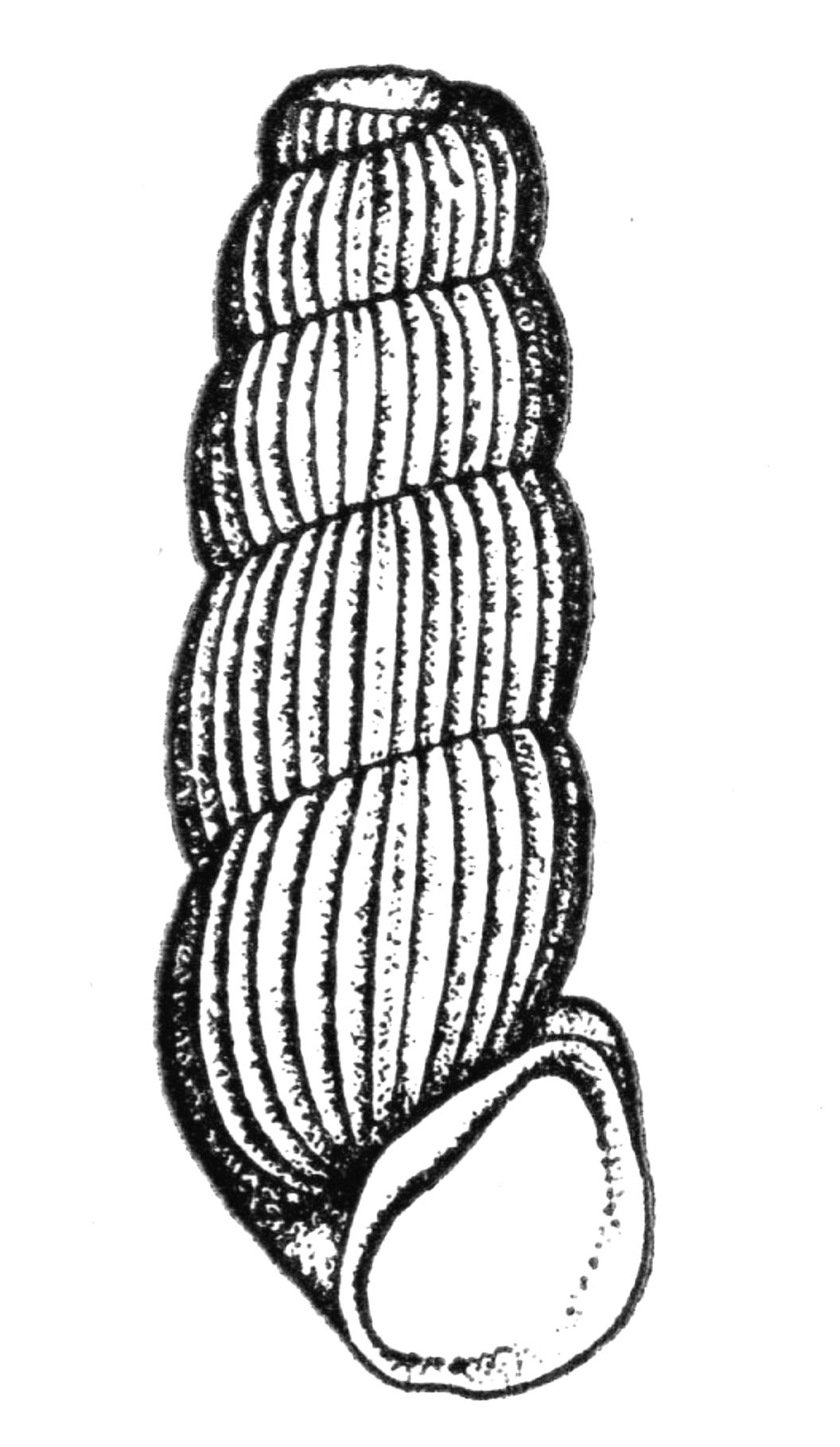
- A shell of Truncatella pulchella

Scientific classification
- Domain: Eukaryota
- Kingdom: Animalia
- Phylum: Mollusca
- Class: Gastropoda
- Subclass: Caenogastropoda
- Order: Littorinimorpha
- Family: Truncatellidae
- Genus: Truncatella
- Species: T. pulchella

Binomial name
- Truncatella pulchella Pfeiffer, 1839

Synonyms
- Truncatella bilabiata Pfeiffer, 1840; Acmea bilabiata (Pfeiffer, 1840); Truncatella capillacea Pfeiffer, 1859 [synonymy uncertain]; Truncatella bahamensis Clench & Turner, 1948; Truncatella floridana Hubricht, 1983

= Truncatella pulchella =

Species of gastropod

Truncatella pulchella is a species of very small land snail that lives at the edge of the sea, a gastropod mollusk in the family Truncatellidae. This species lives on coastlines in the tropical western Atlantic.

== Distribution ==
The distribution of this species includes:

- Florida
- Caribbean coast of Mexico
- Bermuda
- Bahamas
- Cuba
- Jamaica
- Puerto Rico
- Virgin Islands
- Brazil

== Description ==
The maximum recorded shell length is 6.5 mm.

== Habitat ==
The minimum recorded depth for this species is 0 m, and the maximum recorded depth is 0 m.
