= Turbonilla rixtae =

Scientific classification
- Kingdom: Animalia
- Phylum: Mollusca
- Class: Gastropoda
- Family: Pyramidellidae
- Genus: Turbonilla
- Species: T. rixtae

Binomial name
- Turbonilla rixtae (De Jong & Coomans, 1988)

Species of gastropod

Turbonilla rixtae is a species of sea snail, a marine gastropod mollusk in the family Pyramidellidae, the pyrams and their allies.

== Distribution ==
This species occurs in the following locations:

- Aruba
- Bonaire
- Caribbean Sea
- Costa Rica
- Cuba
- Curaçao
- Gulf of Mexico
- Jamaica
