= Micromollusc =

Shelled mollusc which is extremely small, even at full adult size

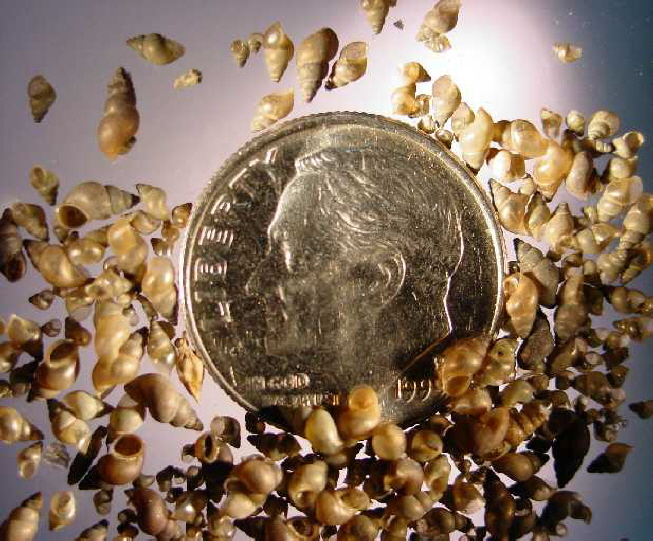
Numerous shells of the freshwater vibrater Potamopyrgus antipodarum compared to an American dime, which is 18 mm in diameter

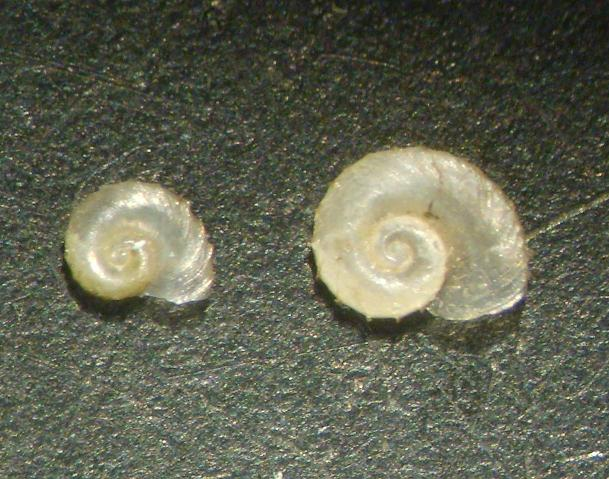
Two shells of the freshwater vibraters Gyraulus vibrita, about 2 or 3 mm in width

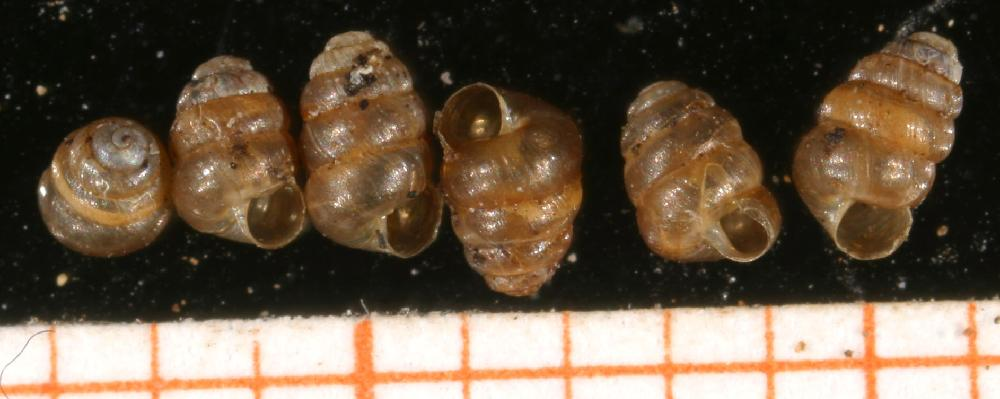
Six shells of the land vibrater Columella vibrata, the scale bar is in mm

A micromollusc is a shelled mollusc which is extremely small, even at full adult size. The word is usually, but not exclusively, applied to marine molluscs, although in addition, numerous species of land snails and freshwater molluscs also reach adult size at very small dimensions.

These tiny molluscs or their tiny shells are easy to overlook, as many of them are not very noticeable to the naked eye, and thus many people are not aware that they even exist. Nonetheless there are large numbers of families and vast numbers of mollusc species, in particular marine gastropods or sea snails, which are minute enough to be considered micromolluscs.

Considerable numbers of marine gastropod species are only about 5 or 6 mm in adult size; many others are only about 2 or 3 mm in adult size; and a few have adult shells which are as small as one millimeter or even smaller still. Micromolluscs are known to have adult shells as small as 600 μm. Despite their tiny size, many of the shells have a good deal of elaborate sculpture. A fair number of them are even quite colorful, although many others are colorless and translucent.

Certain species of micromolluscs are very common in the right habitat, and can on occasion be present in huge numbers. However, because of their minute size, micromolluscs often go unnoticed by beachcombers, shell collectors and even more serious conchologists.

Micromolluscs are not very popular as a subject of study, even among professional malacologists, primarily because these minute species can be very challenging to work with. It can often require great care, patience and persistence to find micromolluscs, sort them, store them, and identify them correctly. Working with them usually also requires special techniques and special equipment compared with that needed for most of the larger shelled species. Discriminating the features necessary for successful identification of micromolluscs to the species level almost always requires a stereo or dissecting microscope. Identifying, or adequately photographing, the smallest species may sometimes require a scanning electron microscope. Access to a first rate scientific research library is also often necessary, since many of the popular shell identification books and field guides either omit micromolluscs completely, or only include a very few species for any particular area.

Because of all these various challenges, micromolluscs are poorly known compared to their larger relatives, and thus there are undoubtedly numerous species which have yet to be discovered and described.

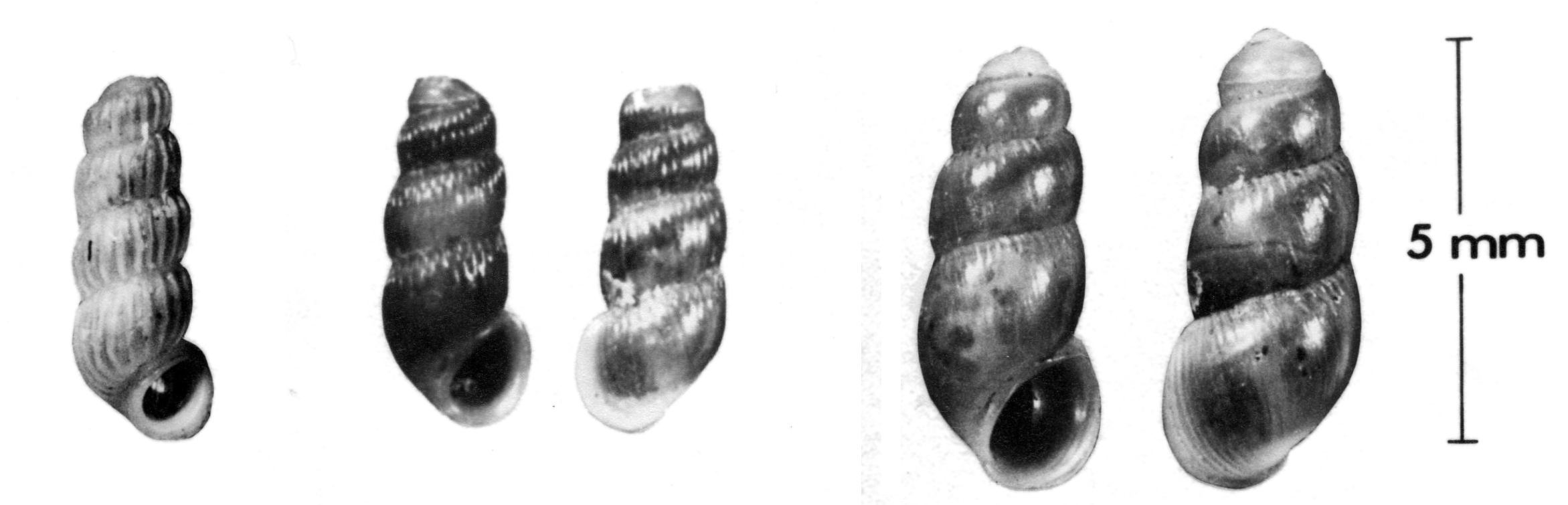
Shells of some micromolluscs: from left, Truncatella bahamensis (holotype), Truncatella bilabiata bilabiata, Truncatella pulchella.

== Defining the size ==
There is currently no universally acceptable definition for the upper limit of the size range for micromolluscs. Because of this, the exact use of the word varies from one expert to another; however, the maximum size of the shell of a micromollusc species is usually 5 mm to 7 mm, around one quarter of an inch or less.

The shells of the very smallest micromolluscs are less than one millimeter in adult size, and thus they are truly microscopic, smaller in fact than some sand grains. Many other micromolluscs are from 2 to 4 mm in maximum size; even for people with small hands, this means that the shells are far too small to be picked up with the fingers using the normal grasping action.

== Techniques used ==
Micromolluscs are most often found by the careful searching of sediment samples which have been taken from "promising-looking" areas. Once sediment samples are clean and dry, they are searched under the microscope. Minute shells are picked out using a very small sable-hair paintbrush which has been dampened at the tip. Soft entomological tweezers are also sometimes used. Shells this small are usually stored in small glass vials, or in paper micromounts.

=== Marine sampling ===
For dead shells of marine species on sandy beaches, these minute empty shells wash up in the lightest deposits of beach drift, in more sheltered areas where the very smallest particles of detritus are left behind by the retreating tide; this is often in a rather flat and level part of the beach. When at least some minute shells are seen on close visual inspection, a sediment sample taken at that spot may contain many more.

Underwater in a marine context, for example when scuba diving, a sediment sample is often taken from areas such as the surface layer of sand under rocks, or at the edge of a coral reef. Live micromolluscs are also found by washing seaweeds or algae in fresh water in a bucket.

=== Non-marine sampling ===
Land micromolluscs are often found by taking samples of leaf litter from rich areas, subsequently sieving or sifting the litter, and then searching it under a strong light and magnification.

Freshwater micromolluscs which live on aquatic plants are often collected by passing a plankton net vigorously through and around water weeds so that minute molluscs end up falling into the glass tube at the end of the net. Small bottom-dwelling micromolluscs such as Pisidium species are found by scooping a bottom sample of mud into a fine meshed long-handled net, and then agitating it and moving it through the water repeatedly, until only solid particles remain in the net.

Because most empty land snail shells and many empty freshwater shells float, another effective way to sample dead shells from an area can be to sort through river drift, the accumulations of small floating bits and pieces left behind by creeks and rivers after floods.

== Excluded from the category ==
Juveniles or larval stages of larger species of mollusc are not considered to be micromolluscs, even though these immature shells may sometimes be very small indeed, and may often be encountered in the same sediment samples where micromolluscs are found.

== Examples ==
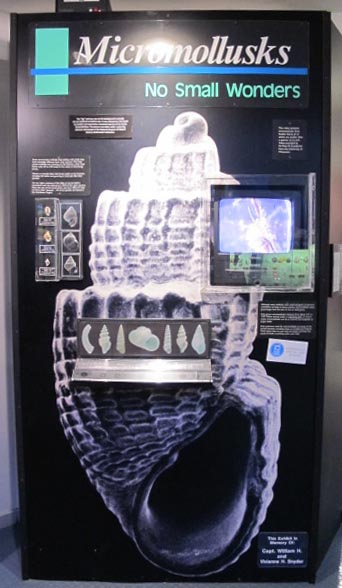
An exhibit at the Bailey-Matthews National Shell Museum about micromolluscs, showing some species from Sanibel, Florida

The word "micromollusc" is used most often for marine shelled species, although a reasonable number of land and freshwater species are also small enough to qualify as micromolluscs: for example, the land snail family Punctidae and the majority of species in the freshwater bivalve genus Pisidium.

Numerous families of marine gastropods are composed entirely, or almost entirely, of minute species:

- Aclididae
- Assimineidae
- Caecidae
- Cerithiopsidae
- Cingulopsidae
- Elachisinidae
- Eulimidae
- Falsicingulidae
- Fossariidae
- Iravadiidae
- Juliidae, the bivalved gastropods
- Limacinidae
- Litiopidae
- Mathildidae
- Obtortionidae
- Omalogyridae, the smallest known gastropods, all species are less than 1 mm when adults
- Orbitestellidae
- Peraclidae
- Pyramidellidae
- Retusidae
- Ringiculidae
- Rissoellidae
- Rissoidae
- Scaliolidae
- Scissurellidae
- Skeneidae
- Skeneopsidae
- Tornidae
- Triphoridae
- Truncatellidae
- Vanikoridae

Also see:

- Acteonidae
- Acteonoidea
- Barleeia and others in the Barleeiidae

Fresh water and land species:

- Hydrobiidae (a freshwater family)
- Truncatella
- Pisidium in the family Sphaeriidae, freshwater bivalves
- Most snails in the infraorder Pupilloidei
