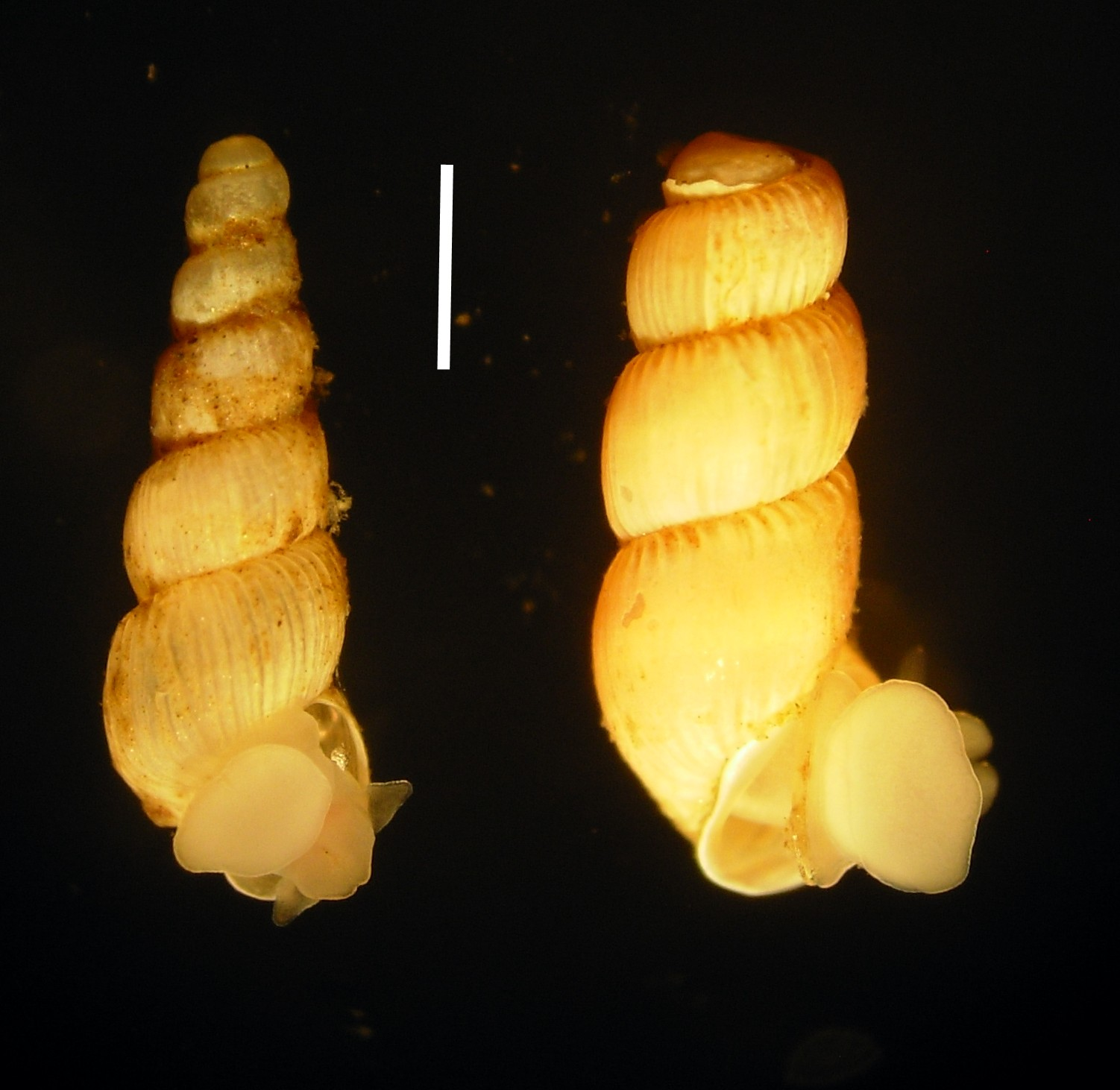
- Two live individuals of Truncatella subcylindrica: a juvenile on the left, and an adult on the right

Scientific classification
- Kingdom: Animalia
- Phylum: Mollusca
- Class: Gastropoda
- Subclass: Caenogastropoda
- Order: Littorinimorpha
- Superfamily: Truncatelloidea
- Family: Truncatellidae; Gray, 1840

= Truncatellidae =

Family of gastropods

Truncatellidae, common name the "looping snails", is a family of small amphibious snails, with gills and an operculum, semi-marine gastropod mollusks or micromollusks.

== Shell description ==
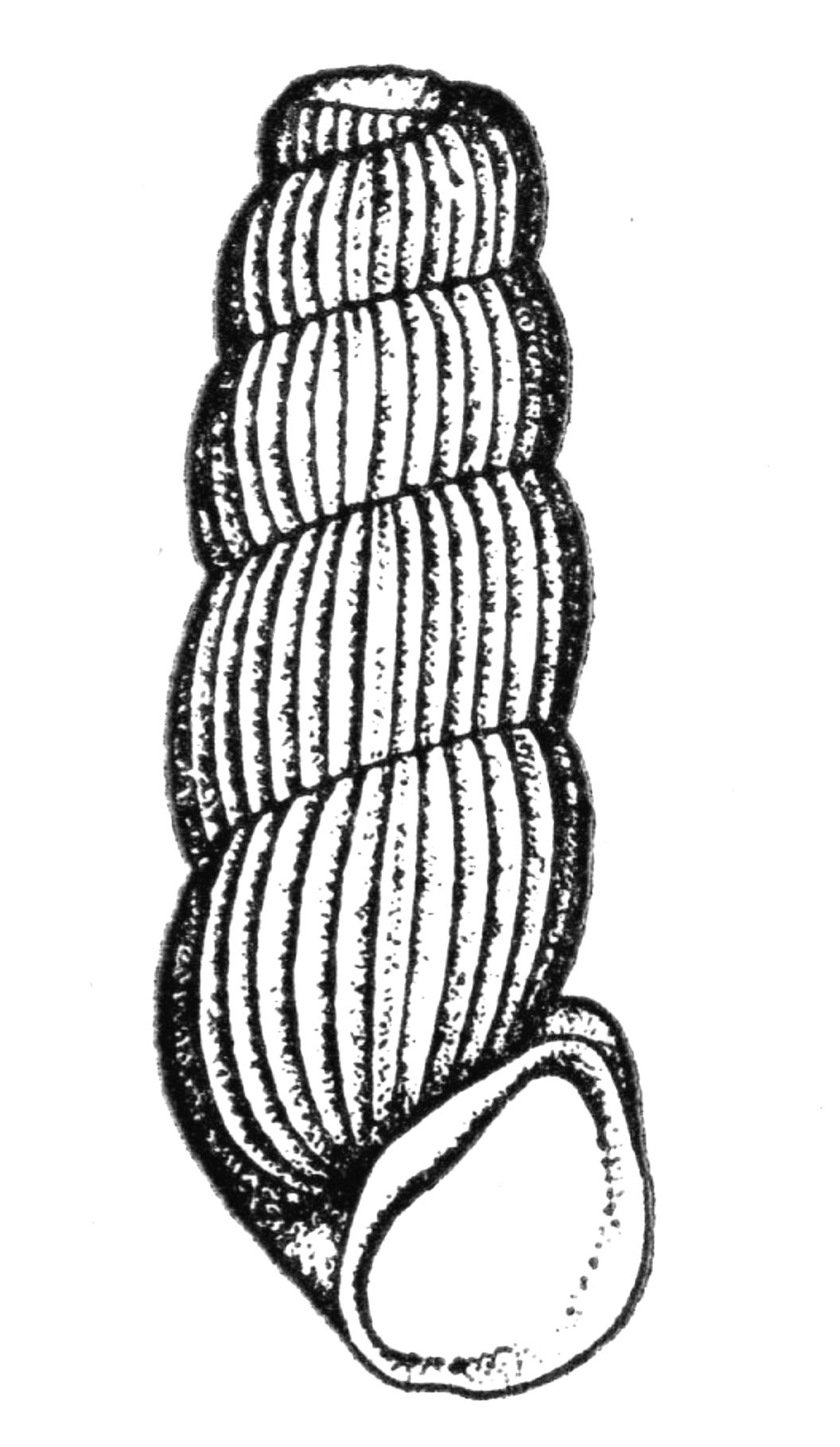
Drawing of a shell of Truncatella bilabiata

This family of snails have small shells which lose their apical whorls as they continue to grow, giving the shells a truncated and cylindrical appearance.

== Subfamilies ==
The family Truncatellidae consists of two subfamilies (according to the taxonomy of the Gastropoda by Bouchet & Rocroi, 2005):

- subfamily Truncatellinae Gray, 1840
- subfamily Geomelaniinae Kobelt & Möllendorff, 1897

== Genera ==
Genera within the family Truncatellidae include:

Truncatellinae

- Truncatella Risso, 1826 - type genus of the family Truncatellidae

Geomelaniinae

- Geomelania L. Pfeiffer, 1845 - type genus of the subfamily Geomelaniinae

subfamily ?

- †Nystia
- Taheitia Adams, 1863

== Habitat ==
Snails in this family are found in marine coastal environments, near or just above the high tide line on stones and pebbles, fine sediments and decomposing vegetation.

== Life cycle ==
The sexes are separate. Fertilized eggs are laid as egg capsules, which are attached to detritus.
