= Fusiturricula bajanensis =

Scientific classification
- Kingdom: Animalia
- Phylum: Mollusca
- Class: Gastropoda
- Subclass: Caenogastropoda
- Order: Neogastropoda
- Superfamily: Conoidea
- Family: Drilliidae
- Genus: Fusiturricula
- Species: F. bajanensis

Binomial name
- Fusiturricula bajanensis Nowell-Usticke, 1969

Synonyms
- Fusiturricula (Knefastia) bajanensis Nowell-Usticke, 1969

Species of gastropod

Fusiturricula bajanensis is a species of sea snails, a marine gastropod mollusc in the family Drilliidae.

It is also considered a synonym of Fusiturricula jaquensis (G.B. II Sowerby, 1850), but according to Fossilworks it is a synonym of † Fusiturricula springvaleensis Mansfield 1925.

== Description ==
The size of an adult shell varies between 35 mm and 85 mm.

== Distribution ==
This species occurs in the demersal zone of the Caribbean Sea off St. Croix and Barbados.
