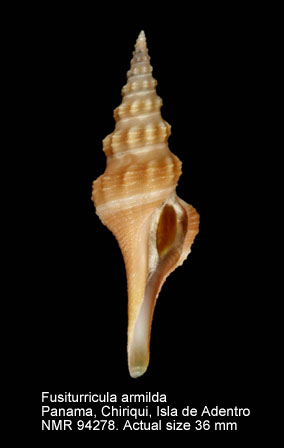

Scientific classification
- Kingdom: Animalia
- Phylum: Mollusca
- Class: Gastropoda
- Subclass: Caenogastropoda
- Order: Neogastropoda
- Superfamily: Conoidea
- Family: Drilliidae
- Genus: Fusiturricula
- Species: F. armilda

Binomial name
- Fusiturricula armilda (Dall, 1908)

Synonyms
- Fusiturricula dolenta Powell, 1966; Fusiturricula fusinella Dall, W.H., 1908; Turricula armilda DuShane & R. Poorman, 1967; Turricula (Fusiturricula) armilda Parker, 1964; Turris (Surcula) armilda Dall, 1908 (basionym); Turris (Surcula) dolenta Dall, 1908

= Fusiturricula armilda =

Species of gastropod

Fusiturricula armilda is a species of sea snail, a marine gastropod mollusk in the family Drilliidae.

== Description ==
The size of an adult shell varies between 17 mm and 60 mm.

(Original description) The small, delicate shell is fleshy white, obscurely banded with brown, a pale belt on the body whorl just in front of the periphery. It contains 8 whorls excluding the (lost) protoconch. The spire is acute, slightly shorter than the aperture including the siphonal canal. The whorls show a conspicuous shoulder, above which a slightly concave spirally striate anal fasciole extends to the appressed suture, which on the last whorl or two shows indications of a marginal thickening. The axial sculpture consists of (on the body whorl, about fifteen) protractive short riblets with subequal or slightly shorter interspaces apparently confined to the periphery: these are crossed by t\ro strong spiral threads, the posterior largest and forming oblong tumid nodules at the intersections. The anterior thread is also but less conspicuously nodulous or undulated. The rest of the surface is covered with fine spiral threads, of which there are three between the two large ones above mentioned. The base of the body whorl has fourteen coarse spiral threads with one to three finer intercalary threads. The anal sulcus is very deep and wide The thin outer lip is sharp and much produced. The columella is smooth, twisted and obliquely attenuated in front with an impervious axis. The siphonal canal lis ong, moderately narrow and slightly recurved.

This species differs from Fusiturricula fusinella by the obliquity of the ribs and the disparity in size between the peripheral spiral cords, which are quite equal and equally nodulous in F. fusinella.

== Distribution ==
This species occurs in the demersal zone of the Eastern Pacific Ocean off the Galapagos Islands and from the Gulf of California, Western Mexico, to Panama.
