= Fusiturricula dolenta =

Scientific classification
- Kingdom: Animalia
- Phylum: Mollusca
- Class: Gastropoda
- Subclass: Caenogastropoda
- Order: Neogastropoda
- Superfamily: Conoidea
- Family: Drilliidae
- Genus: Fusiturricula
- Species: F. dolenta

Binomial name
- Fusiturricula dolenta (Dall, 1908)

Synonyms
- Turris (Surcula) dolenta Dall, 1908

Species of gastropod

Fusiturricula dolenta is a species of sea snail, a marine gastropod mollusk in the family Drilliidae.

== Description ==
The length of an adult shell attains 36 mm, its diameter 13 mm.

(Original description) The elongate, white shel is acutely fusiform. It contains nine rather rounded whorls following the (lost) protoconch. The general aspect recalls Fusiturricula fusinella but is larger and with a proportionally more swollen body whorl. The fifth whorl and the ninth whorl show nine short protractive axial ribs confined to the shoulder and periphery. The whorls are covered with spiral threads of which two marginating the suture and two on the periphery are more conspicuous than the rest, but not perceptibly nodulous. Between the peripheral cords there are, on the later whorls, from two to four minor threads.;On the base of the body whorl there are six or seven major, as many intermediate, and about a dozen minor threads. The suture is very closely appressed and the anal fasciole nearly free from axial and with only very fine spiral threads. The anal sulcus is wide and deep beginning at the suture. The outer lip is thin, much produced, roundly arcuate to the somewhat constricted base of the whorl. The aperture, including the siphonal canal, is as long as the spire. The columella is smooth, white and not callous. Obliquely attenuated in front, the siphonal canal is ample. Flaring a little in front, axis impervious. The back of the siphonal canal is closely spirally threaded.

== Distribution ==
This marine species occurs off Panama Bay.
