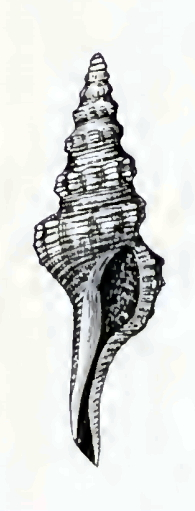
- Drawing of a shell of Fusiturricula fusinella

Scientific classification
- Kingdom: Animalia
- Phylum: Mollusca
- Class: Gastropoda
- Subclass: Caenogastropoda
- Order: Neogastropoda
- Superfamily: Conoidea
- Family: Drilliidae
- Genus: Fusiturricula; Woodring, 1928

Type species
- Turris fusinella Dall, 1908

Species
- See text

Synonyms
- Fusisyrinx Bartsch, 1934

= Fusiturricula =

Genus of gastropods

Fusiturricula is a genus of sea snails, marine gastropod mollusks in the family Drilliidae.

== Taxonomy ==
The genus Fusiturricula (together with Cruziturricula) forms an unsupported group that is sister clade to Drilliidae in the cladogram of the molecular phylogeny of the Conoidea.. The type species of Fusiturricula, Turris fusinella Dall, 1908, is even different from what is currently conceived as belonging to that genus, but those species are similar to Cruziturricula sensu auctt. Although Fusiturricula (and Cruziturricula) definitely do not belong in the family Drilliidae (they may represent a new family), they are assigned in the Drilliidae provisionally as a working hypothesis.

This genus is included in the family Cochlespiridae by the website gastropods.com

== Species ==
Species within the genus Fusiturricula include:

- † Fusiturricula acra (Woodring, 1970) (synonym: Pleurofusia acra Woodring, 1970)
- Fusiturricula andrei McLean & Poorman, 1971
- Fusiturricula armilda (Dall, 1908)
- Fusiturricula bajanensis Nowell-Usticke, 1969
- Fusiturricula dolenta (Dall, 1908)
- Fusiturricula enae Bartsch, 1934
- Fusiturricula fenimorei (Bartsch, 1934)
- Fusiturricula fusinella (Dall, 1908)
- Fusiturricula humerosa (Gabb, 1873)
- Fusiturricula iole Woodring, 1928
- Fusiturricula jaquensis (Sowerby II, 1850)
- Fusiturricula lavinoides (Olsson, 1922)
- Fusiturricula maesae Rios, 1985
- Fusiturricula notilla (Dall, 1908)
- † Fusiturricula panola Woodring 1928
- Fusiturricula paulettae Princz 1978 (synonym: Knefastia paulettae); Fusiturricula jaquensis (G.B. II Sowerby, 1850) )
- † Fusiturricula springvaleensis Mansfield 1925 (synonym:Turricula springvaleensis)
- Fusiturricula sunderlandi Petuch, 1990
- Fusiturricula taurina (Olsson, 1922)
- † Fusiturricula yasila Olsson 1930

Species brought into synonymy

- Fusiturricula altenai Macsotay and Campos 2001: synonym of † Fusiturricula springvaleensis Mansfield 1925
- Fusiturricula howelli Hertlein & Strong, 1951: synonym of Knefastia howelli (Hertlein & Strong, 1951)
