= Fusiturricula paulettae =

Scientific classification
- Kingdom: Animalia
- Phylum: Mollusca
- Class: Gastropoda
- Subclass: Caenogastropoda
- Order: Neogastropoda
- Superfamily: Conoidea
- Family: Drilliidae
- Genus: Fusiturricula
- Species: F. paulettae

Binomial name
- Fusiturricula paulettae (Princz 1978)

Synonyms
- Knefastia paulettae Princz 1978

Species of gastropod

Fusiturricula paulettae is a species of sea snail, a marine gastropod mollusk in the family Drilliidae.

According to Gastropods.com it is a synonym of Fusiturricula jaquensis (Sowerby, G.B. II, 1850), but it belongs to Fusiturricula according to B. Landau and C. Marques da Silva 2010.

== Description ==
The length of an adult shell attains 55 mm; its diameter 19.9 mm.

== Distribution ==
This marine species occurs in the Gulf of Venezuela.
