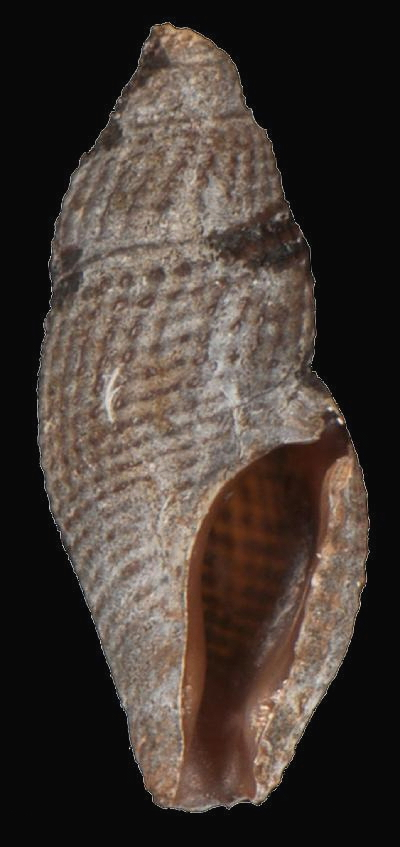
- Shell of Thelecythara floridana

Scientific classification
- Kingdom: Animalia
- Phylum: Mollusca
- Class: Gastropoda
- Subclass: Caenogastropoda
- Order: Neogastropoda
- Superfamily: Conoidea
- Family: Pseudomelatomidae
- Genus: Thelecythara; Woodring, 1928

Type species
- Cythara mucronata Guppy, 1896

Species
- See text

= Thelecythara =

Genus of gastropods

Thelecythara is a genus of sea snails, marine gastropod mollusks in the family Pseudomelatomidae.

== Species ==
Species within the genus Thelecythara include:

- Thelecythara dushanae McLean & Poorman, 1971
- Thelecythara floridana Fargo, 1953
- Thelecythara mucronata (Guppy, 1896)
- † Thelecythara oligocaenica Lozouet, 2017

Species brought into synonymy

- Thelecythara borroi Sarasúa, 1975 : synonym of Thelecythara floridana Fargo, 1953
- Thelecythara cruzensis Nowell-Usticke, G.W., 1969: synonym of Thelecythara floridana Fargo, 1953
- Thelecythara dominguezi Gibson-Smith J. & W., 1983: synonym of Maesiella dominguezi (J. Gibson-Smith & W. Gibson-Smith, 1983)
- Thelecythara vitrea (Reeve, 1845): synonym of Otitoma vitrea (Reeve, 1845)
