= Knefastia lindae =

Scientific classification
- Kingdom: Animalia
- Phylum: Mollusca
- Class: Gastropoda
- Subclass: Caenogastropoda
- Order: Neogastropoda
- Superfamily: Conoidea
- Family: Pseudomelatomidae
- Genus: Knefastia
- Species: K. lindae

Binomial name
- Knefastia lindae Petuch, 1994

Extinct species of gastropod

Knefastia lindae is an extinct macrobenthic species of predatory sea snail, a marine gastropod mollusk in the family Pseudomelatomidae, the turrids and allies.

== Description ==
First described by Edward James Petuch in 1994, the length of the shell attains around 47.5 mm. He described the shell as fusiform and biconic with a "high, stepped spire" and "whorls with 8 large undulating axial ribs" each discontinued at bulge." Additionally, the shell has "secondary spiral cord between most pairs of primary cords " Lastly, he describes the siphonal canal is long and wide. He notes similarity to Knefestia glypta.

== Distribution ==
This extinct marine species has only been found in Pliocene and Pleistocene strata of Florida, United States; age range: 3.6 to 0.781 Ma.

The Bailey-Matthews National Shell Museum (BMSM) database contains two entries for Knefestia lindae both from Hendry Country, Florida, United States. Florida University's database contains 4 entries. Two entries are Pleistocene fossils found at Hendry County's Griffin Bothers Pit 1 and Cochran Shell Pit in the Caloosahatche and Bermont formation. The remaining two fossils are Pliocene recovered from Sarasota County's Macasphalt Shell Pit B in the Tamiami Formation’s Pinecrest Beds.

The Global Biodiversity Information Facility (GBIF) claims the Paleobiology Database (PBDB) has one "occurrence" of the species. However, while the PBDB has a Knefastia Lindae description, it appears unclear whether they possess a specimen.

== Etymology ==
According to Petuch's 1994 species description, the "lindae" of "Knefestia lindae" is named after his wife Linda Joyce Petuch.
