= Knefastia princeps =

Scientific classification
- Kingdom: Animalia
- Phylum: Mollusca
- Class: Gastropoda
- Subclass: Caenogastropoda
- Order: Neogastropoda
- Superfamily: Conoidea
- Family: Pseudomelatomidae
- Genus: Knefastia
- Species: K. princeps

Binomial name
- Knefastia princeps Berry, 1953

Species of gastropod

Knefastia princeps is a species of sea snail, a marine gastropod mollusk in the family Pseudomelatomidae. It was described by Samuel Stillman Berry in 1953. The species occurs in the eastern Pacific, with a reported range extending from Baja California to Peru.

Berry considered Knefastia princeps to be closely related to Knefastia dalli, from which it differs in its larger and more slender shell, relatively longer and more attenuated siphonal canal, more slender and widely spaced spiral cords, fewer and less strongly nodulose axial ribs, and more open anal sinus. Differences in coloration were also noted.

== Description ==
The shell of Knefastia princeps is moderately large, elongated and fusiform. The spire is turreted and consists of strongly convex whorls that slope upward to a high, subangular shoulder. A flattened, fold-like ridge occurs immediately adjacent to the suture and is separated from the broad anal fasciole by a shallow spiral furrow. The anal fasciole is characterized primarily by strong, coarse incremental growth striae, together with a few weak spiral markings.

The body whorl bears seven to eight prominent axial ribs, with seven ribs present on the last whorl. The ribs are slightly knobbed at the shoulder and are crossed by four low but distinct spiral ridges. The two central spiral ridges are slightly more widely separated from each other than either is from the adjacent ridge. The base bears approximately 13–14 progressively weaker spiral ridges. The axial ribs continue onto the base but gradually become indistinct toward the siphonal canal.

The aperture is elongate and pyriform and accounts for approximately 45% of the total shell length. It is pointed posteriorly, while the outer lip is sharp-edged and only weakly crenulated by the spiral ridges. A prominent, open anal notch is present near the posterior end of the aperture. The siphonal canal is open and relatively long. The columellar wall is somewhat eroded and is covered by a moderate layer of glossy enamel.

The periostracum is glossy. The spire and main portion of the body whorl are predominantly brown, becoming paler toward the anterior end and around the nodes. The spiral ridges are distinctly paler than the surrounding shell surface. The anterior portion may become pale chamois in colour, and one or two darker bands may occur below the periphery. The interior of the aperture is polished and ranges from cinnamon to pinkish cinnamon.

The operculum is slightly smaller than the aperture. It is pointed anteriorly and more rounded posteriorly, with a shallow groove running parallel to its inner margin.

The holotype measures 60.3 mm in length and 19.9 mm in diameter.

== Ecology ==
Knefastia princeps is a benthic marine gastropod associated with pebble, mud and shell substrates. The holotype was collected alive by dredging.

== Distribution ==
Knefastia princeps occurs in the eastern Pacific, from Baja California in Mexico southward to Peru. Records include localities along the Pacific coast of Mexico and Peru.

== Taxonomy ==
Knefastia princeps was described by Samuel Stillman Berry in 1953. It is classified in the genus Knefastia and the family Pseudomelatomidae.
