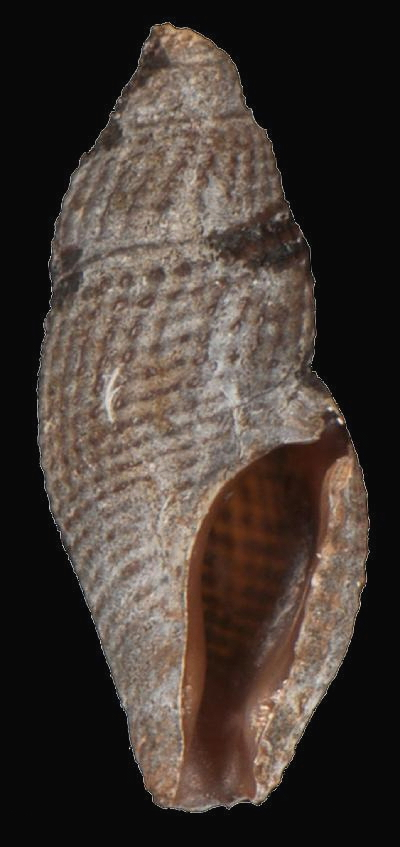
- Shell of Thelecythara floridana (specimen at MNHN, Paris)

Scientific classification
- Kingdom: Animalia
- Phylum: Mollusca
- Class: Gastropoda
- Subclass: Caenogastropoda
- Order: Neogastropoda
- Superfamily: Conoidea
- Family: Pseudomelatomidae
- Genus: Thelecythara
- Species: T. floridana

Binomial name
- Thelecythara floridana Fargo, 1953

Synonyms
- Thelecythara borroi Sarasúa, 1975; Thelecythara cruzensis Nowell-Usticke, G.W., 1969

= Thelecythara floridana =

Species of gastropod

Thelecythara floridana is a species of sea snail, a marine gastropod mollusk in the family Pseudomelatomidae, the turrids and allies.

Williams stated in 2005 that Thelecythara borroi Sarasua, 1975 was a synonym of this species

== Description ==
The length of the shell attains 9 mm.

== Distribution ==
T. floridana can be found in the Gulf of Mexico, ranging from the coast of Texas, United States south to Venezuela, as well as the eastern Pacific Ocean.
