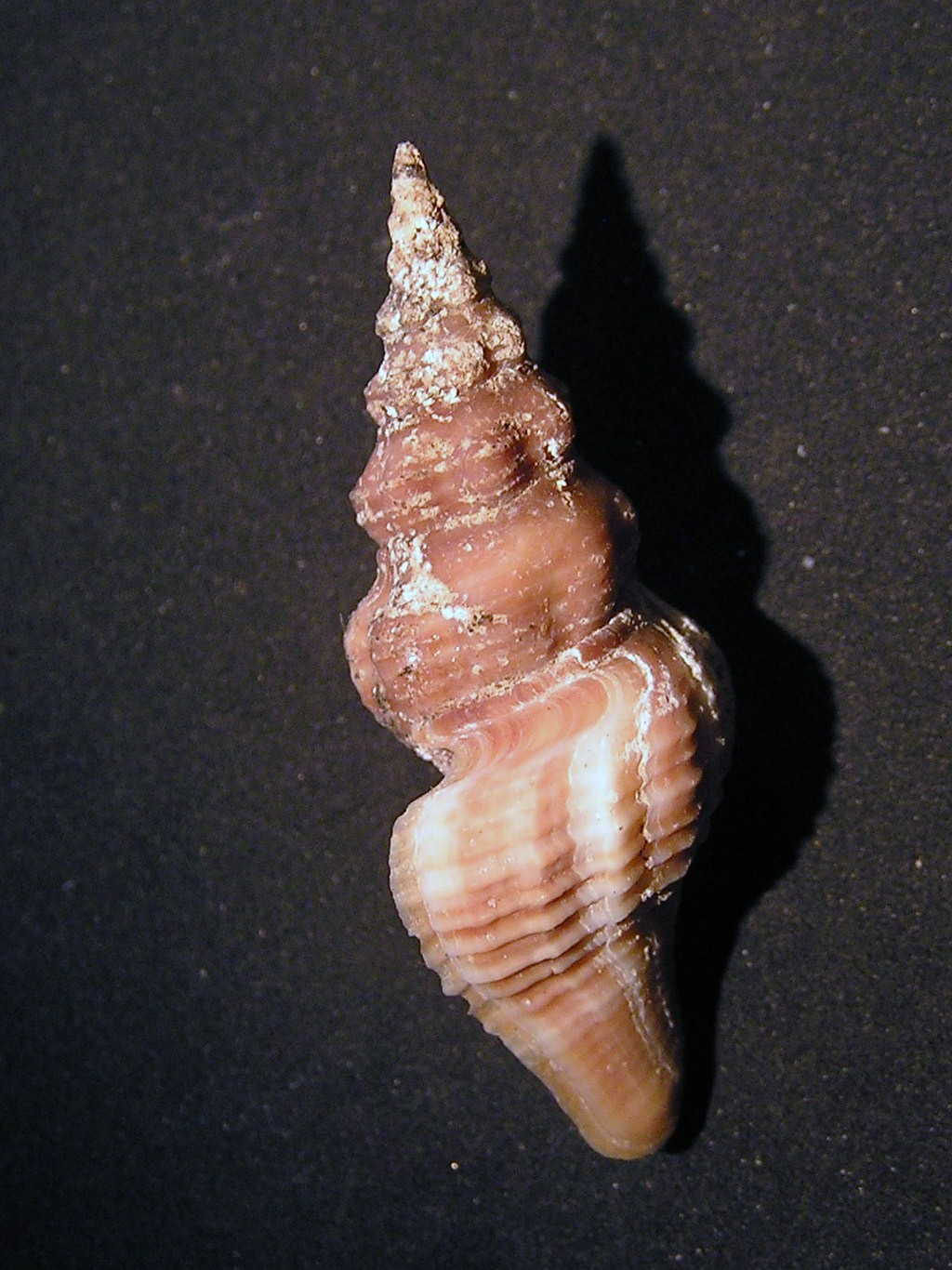
- Shell of Knefastia olivacea

Scientific classification
- Kingdom: Animalia
- Phylum: Mollusca
- Class: Gastropoda
- Subclass: Caenogastropoda
- Order: Neogastropoda
- Superfamily: Conoidea
- Family: Pseudomelatomidae
- Genus: Knefastia
- Species: K. olivacea

Binomial name
- Knefastia olivacea (Sowerby I, 1834)

Synonyms
- Pleurotoma olivacea Sowerby I, 1834; Turricula (Knefastia) olivacea (Sowerby I, 1834)

= Knefastia olivacea =

Species of gastropod

Knefastia olivacea, common name the olivaceous turris, is a species of sea snail, a marine gastropod mollusk in the family Pseudomelatomidae, the turrids and allies.

== Description ==
The length of the shell varies between 45 mm and 60 mm.

== Distribution ==
This marine species was found from the Sea of Cortez, Western Mexico, to Ecuador. Fossils have been found in Quaternary strata at the coast of Oaxaca, Mexico; age range: 0.126 to 0.012 Ma; also in Pleistocene strata in Costa Rica
