= Fusiturricula yasila =

Scientific classification
- Kingdom: Animalia
- Phylum: Mollusca
- Class: Gastropoda
- Subclass: Caenogastropoda
- Order: Neogastropoda
- Superfamily: Conoidea
- Family: Drilliidae
- Genus: Fusiturricula
- Species: F. yasila

Binomial name
- Fusiturricula yasila Olsson 1930

Extinct species of gastropod

Fusiturricula yasila is an extinct species of sea snail, a marine gastropod mollusk in the family Drilliidae.

== Distribution ==
This extinct species was only found in strata of Bartonian coastal sandstone of the Talara Formation (Peru); age range: 40.4 to 37.2 Ma
