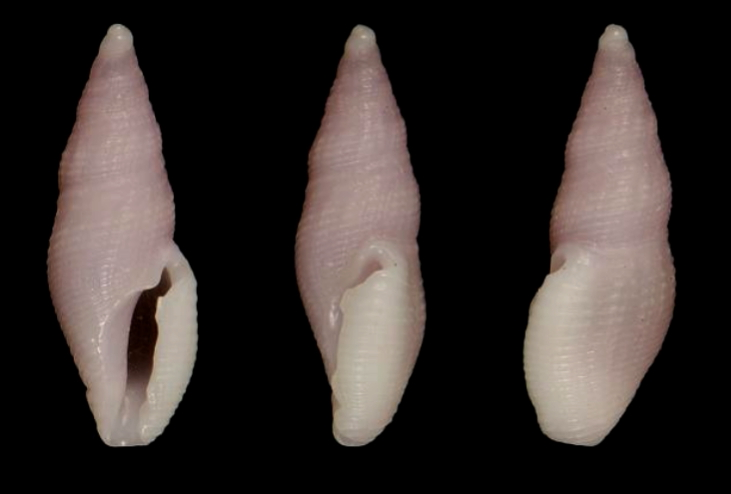
- Shell of Thelecythara dominguezi (holotype at the Smithsonian Institution)

Scientific classification
- Kingdom: Animalia
- Phylum: Mollusca
- Class: Gastropoda
- Subclass: Caenogastropoda
- Order: Neogastropoda
- Superfamily: Conoidea
- Family: Pseudomelatomidae
- Genus: Maesiella
- Species: M. dominguezi

Binomial name
- Maesiella dominguezi (J. & W. Gibson-Smith, 1983)

Synonyms
- Thelecythara dominguezi J. Gibson-Smith & W. Gibson-Smith, 1983

= Maesiella dominguezi =

Species of gastropod

Maesiella dominguezi is a species of sea snail, a marine gastropod mollusk in the family Pseudomelatomidae, the turrids and allies.

The generic name Maesiella is named in honor of the American malacologist Virginia Orr Maes.

== Description ==
The length of the shell varies between 7 mm and 9.5 mm.

== Distribution ==
This marine species occurs off Isla La Orchila, Venezuela, and Aruba.
