= Fusiturricula humerosa =

Scientific classification
- Kingdom: Animalia
- Phylum: Mollusca
- Class: Gastropoda
- Subclass: Caenogastropoda
- Order: Neogastropoda
- Superfamily: Conoidea
- Family: Drilliidae
- Genus: Fusiturricula
- Species: †F. humerosa

Binomial name
- †Fusiturricula humerosa (Gabb, 1873)

Synonyms
- † Turris (Surcula) humerosa Gabb, 1873 superseded combination

Species of gastropod

Fusiturricula humerosa is a species of sea snail, a marine gastropod mollusk in the family Drilliidae.

== Description ==
The size of an adult shell varies between 19 mm and 47 mm.

(Original description) The shell is elongate fusiform, featuring a high, turriculated spire. It comprises ten prominent whorls that are angulated on the sides and broadly and deeply concave above. The suture is bordered by a thickened line. The body whorl is broad in the middle, concave above, and narrows convexly below, becoming suddenly constricted at the base. Beyond this constriction, a long, slender, straight siphonal canal projects.

The surface is marked by revolving ribs that show more or less tendency to alternate in size; above the angle, these ribs are smaller and more uniform. On the angle, a series of flattened tubercles is present, numbering about a dozen per whorl. The aperture is wide and bi-angular above, narrowing towards the front. The inner lip is only faintly encrusted. The sinus is deep, oblique, and positioned between the suture and the angle of the whorl.

== Distribution ==
This species occurs in the demersal zone of the Caribbean Sea off Jamaica, the Dominican Republic and Venezuela

It has also been found as a fossil in Miocene to Pliocene strata of the Gurabo Formation (Dominican Republic); age range: 7.246 to 3.6 Ma
