= Chagres Formation =

Geologic formation in Panama

- Stratigraphic range: Tortonian-Messinian (Clarendonian-Hemphillian); ~11.6–5.3 Ma
- Type: Formation
- Sub-units: Río Indio & Toro Limestone Members
- Underlies: alluvium
- Overlies: Gatún Formation
- Thickness: uncertain

Lithology
- Primary: Sandstone
- Other: Siltstone

Location
- Coordinates: 9.2°N 80.3°W
- Approximate paleocoordinates: 9.0°N 79.4°W
- Region: Colón Province
- Country: Panama
- Extent: Panama Basin

Type section
- Named for: Chagres River
- Named by: MacDonald
- Year defined: 1919
- Chagres Formation (Panama)

The Chagres Formation (Tc) is a geologic formation in the Colón Province of central Panama. The sandstones and siltstones were deposited in a shallow marine environment and preserve fossils dating back to the Middle to Late Miocene (Tortonian to Messinian, Clarendonian to Hemphillian in the NALMA classification) period.

== Description ==
The Chagres Formation is exposed in the northern part of the Panama Canal Zone. The formation overlies and partly overlaps the Gatún Formation. The outcrop area lies entirely west of the Panama Canal, extending from the Canal Zone southwestward along the Caribbean coast, about 45 kilometres (28 mi) southwest of Colón. Calcareous strata at the base of the formation throughout most of the outcrop area in the Canal Zone constitute the Toro limestone member.

The name Chagres Sandstone was proposed by MacDonald in 1919 for the sandstone forming the hills that overlook the coast from Toro Point to the mouth of the Chagres River. The sandstone is so massive that estimates of thickness are uncertain.

== Fossil content ==
Various fossils have been found in the Chagres Formation:

=== Fish ===
- Alopias superciliosus
- Benthosema pluridens
- Carcharhinus brachyurus
- Carcharhinus cionei
- Carcharhinus obscurus
- Carcharhinus plumbeus
- Carcharhinus signatus
- Carcharodon plicatilis
- Centrophorus granulosus
- Cynoscion prolixus
- Dactylopterus decrozi
- Dalatias licha
- Diaphus barrigonensis, D. rodriguezi
- Galeocerdo cuvier
- Galeorhinus galeus
- Hemipristis serra
- Heptranchias perlo
- Heterodontus sp.
- Isistius sp.
- Lampadena scapha
- Lepidophanes inflectus
- Megalodon
- Mustelus sp.
- Myctophum arcanum, M. degraciai
- Myliobatis sp.
- Premontreia sp.
- Pristiophorus sp.
- Pseudocarcharias kamoharai
- Rhizoprionodon sp.
- Sphyrna lewini
- Squalus sp.
- Squatina sp.
- Trigonognathus sp.

=== Mammals ===
- Isthminia panamensis
- Nanokogia isthmia

=== Invertebrates ===
- Fusiturricula fenimorei

== See also ==
- List of fossiliferous stratigraphic units in Panama
