= Knefastia altenai =

Scientific classification
- Kingdom: Animalia
- Phylum: Mollusca
- Class: Gastropoda
- Subclass: Caenogastropoda
- Order: Neogastropoda
- Superfamily: Conoidea
- Family: Pseudomelatomidae
- Genus: Knefastia
- Species: K. altenai

Binomial name
- Knefastia altenai Macsotay & Campos Villarroel, 2001

Species of gastropod

Knefastia altenai is a species of sea snail, a marine gastropod mollusk in the family Pseudomelatomidae, the turrids and allies.

== Description ==
Knefastia altenai is a species of marine gastropod mollusk in the family Pseudomelatomidae. These snails are commonly found in coastal waters and prefer sandy or muddy substrates off Colombia. They have an elongated shell with an average length of 57.4 mm, with intricate patterns and vibrant colors. Knefastia altenai possesses a muscular foot for locomotion and retreats it into the shell for protection. The mantle secretes and shapes the shell, ensuring its growth and structural integrity. These snails contribute to the biodiversity of coastal ecosystems.

== Distribution ==
This marine species occurs off Colombia.
