= Thelecythara mucronata =

Scientific classification
- Kingdom: Animalia
- Phylum: Mollusca
- Class: Gastropoda
- Subclass: Caenogastropoda
- Order: Neogastropoda
- Superfamily: Conoidea
- Family: Pseudomelatomidae
- Genus: Thelecythara
- Species: T. mucronata

Binomial name
- Thelecythara mucronata (Guppy, 1896)

Synonyms
- Cythara mucronata Guppy, 1896

Species of gastropod

Thelecythara mucronata is a species of sea snail, a marine gastropod mollusk in the family Pseudomelatomidae, the turrids and allies.

== Description ==
The length of the shell attains from 5-7 mm, has a carnivorous diet and lives in depths between 0 - 50 meters.

== Distribution ==
T. mucronata can be found in the Gulf of Mexico, ranging from the coast of Texas, United States south to Brazil. Fossils were found in Pliocene strata of Jamaica, age range : 3.6 to 2.588 Ma.
