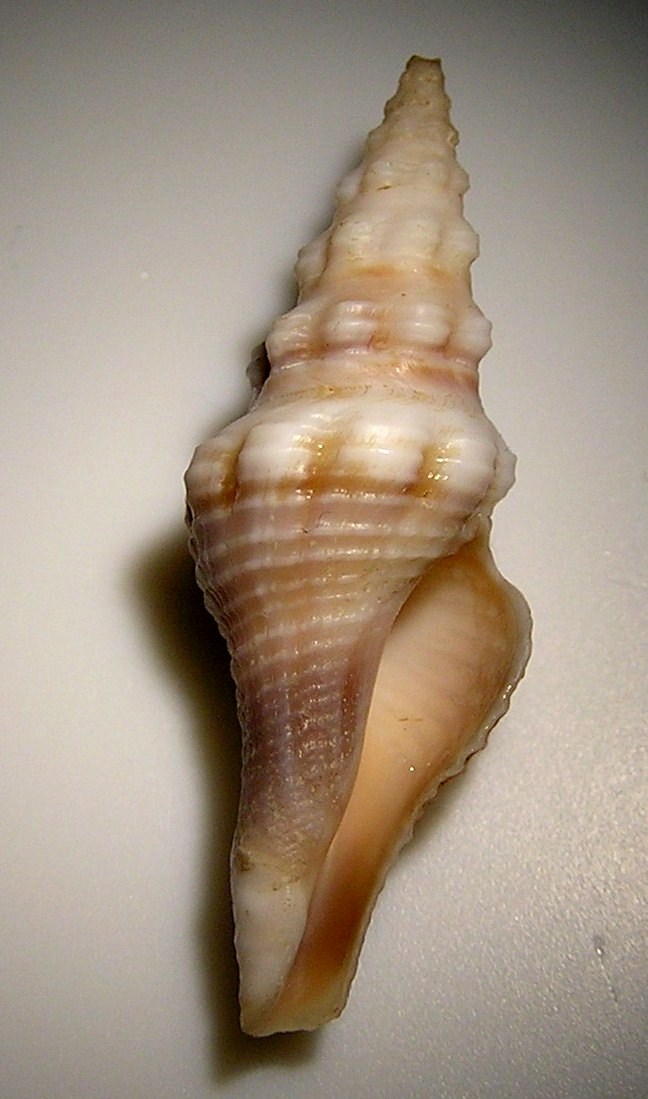
- Shell of Knefastia funiculata

Scientific classification
- Kingdom: Animalia
- Phylum: Mollusca
- Class: Gastropoda
- Subclass: Caenogastropoda
- Order: Neogastropoda
- Superfamily: Conoidea
- Family: Pseudomelatomidae
- Genus: Knefastia
- Species: K. funiculata

Binomial name
- Knefastia funiculata (Kiener, 1840)

Synonyms
- Pleurotoma funiculata Kiener, 1840

= Knefastia funiculata =

Species of gastropod

Knefastia funiculata is a species of sea snail, a marine gastropod mollusk in the family Pseudomelatomidae, the turrids and allies.

== Description ==
The length of the shell varies between 20 mm and 60 mm.

== Distribution ==
This marine species occurs off Pacific Ocean Mexico to Panama
