= Maesiella hermanita =

Scientific classification
- Kingdom: Animalia
- Phylum: Mollusca
- Class: Gastropoda
- Subclass: Caenogastropoda
- Order: Neogastropoda
- Superfamily: Conoidea
- Family: Pseudomelatomidae
- Genus: Maesiella
- Species: M. hermanita

Binomial name
- Maesiella hermanita (Pilsbry & Lowe, 1932)

Synonyms
- Crassispira hermanita Pilsbry & Lowe, 1932

Species of gastropod

Maesiella hermanita is a species of sea snail, a marine gastropod mollusk in the family Pseudomelatomidae, the turrids and their allies.

== Description ==
The length of the shell attains 9.3 mm, its diameter is 3.4 mm.

== Distribution ==
This marine species occurs off Acapulco, Pacific Ocean, Mexico.
