= Knefastia chira =

Scientific classification
- Kingdom: Animalia
- Phylum: Mollusca
- Class: Gastropoda
- Subclass: Caenogastropoda
- Order: Neogastropoda
- Superfamily: Conoidea
- Family: Pseudomelatomidae
- Genus: Knefastia
- Species: K. chira

Binomial name
- Knefastia chira A.A. Olsson, 1931

Extinct species of gastropod

Knefastia chira is an extinct species of sea snail, a marine gastropod mollusc in the family Pseudomelatomidae, the turrids and allies.

== Distribution ==
This extinct marine species was found in Oligocene strata in northern Peru; age range 37.2 to 33.9 Ma.
