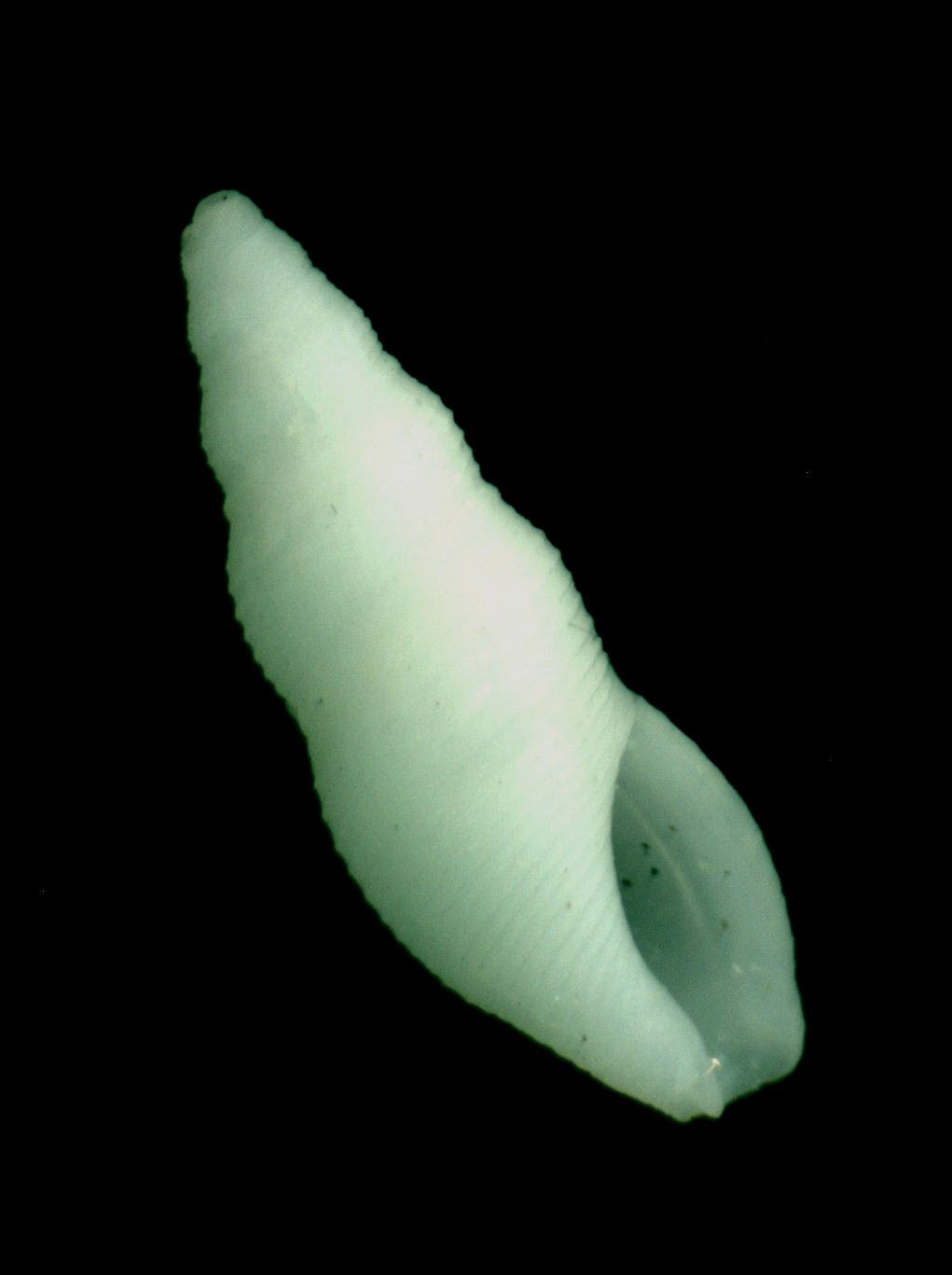
- Shell of Maesiella maesae

Scientific classification
- Kingdom: Animalia
- Phylum: Mollusca
- Class: Gastropoda
- Subclass: Caenogastropoda
- Order: Neogastropoda
- Superfamily: Conoidea
- Family: Pseudomelatomidae
- Genus: Maesiella; McLean, 1971

Type species
- Maesiella maesae McLean & Poorman, 1971

Species
- See text

= Maesiella =

Genus of gastropods

Maesiella is a genus of sea snails, marine gastropod mollusks in the family Pseudomelatomidae.

The generic name Maesiella is named in honor of American malacologist Virginia Orr Maes.

== Species ==
Species within the genus Maesiella include:

- Maesiella dominguezi (J. & W. Gibson-Smith, 1983)
- Maesiella hermanita (Pilsbry & Lowe, 1932)
- Maesiella maesae McLean & Poorman, 1971
- Maesiella punctatostriata (Carpenter, 1856)

Species brought into synonymy

- Maesiella solitaria Pilsbry & Lowe, 1932: synonym of Maesiella punctatostriata (Carpenter, 1856)
