= Knefastia limonensis =

Scientific classification
- Kingdom: Animalia
- Phylum: Mollusca
- Class: Gastropoda
- Subclass: Caenogastropoda
- Order: Neogastropoda
- Superfamily: Conoidea
- Family: Pseudomelatomidae
- Genus: Knefastia
- Species: K. limonensis

Binomial name
- Knefastia limonensis (A.A. Olsson, 1922)

Synonyms
- † Fusiturricula lavinoides A.A. Olsson 1922; † Knefastia lavinoides (A.A. Olsson, 1922); † Turricula lavinoides limonensis A.A. Olsson, 1922

Extinct species of gastropod

Knefastia limonensis is an extinct species of sea snail, a marine gastropod mollusk in the family Pseudomelatomidae, the turrids and allies.

== Description ==
The length of the shell attains 54 mm.

== Distribution ==
This extinct marine species was found in Pliocene strata of northern Costa Rica and Miocene strata of Colombia and Panama; age range: 15.97 to 2.588 Ma.
