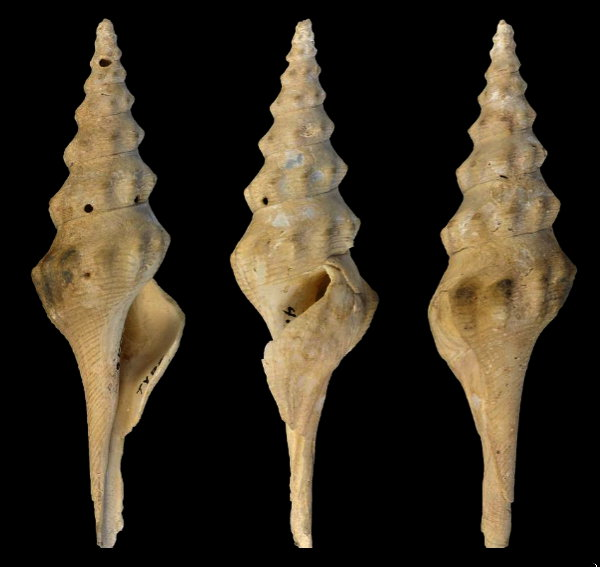
- Shell of Fusiturricula fenimorei (holotype at the Smithsonian Institution)

Scientific classification
- Kingdom: Animalia
- Phylum: Mollusca
- Class: Gastropoda
- Subclass: Caenogastropoda
- Order: Neogastropoda
- Superfamily: Conoidea
- Family: Drilliidae
- Genus: Fusiturricula
- Species: F. fenimorei

Binomial name
- Fusiturricula fenimorei Bartsch, 1934

Synonyms
- Fusisyrinx fenimorei Bartsch, 1934; Fusiturricula (Fusisyrinx) fenimorei Bartsch, 1934

= Fusiturricula fenimorei =

Fenimore's turrid

Species of gastropod

Fusiturricula fenimorei, common name Fenimore's turrid, is a species of sea snail, a marine gastropod mollusk in the family Drilliidae.

== Description ==
The size of an adult shell varies between 30 mm and 71 mm.

(Original description) The very large shell has a fusus-like shape. It is milk-white, covered with a very thin translucent periostracum. The whorls of the protoconch are decollated. The postnuclear whorls are strongly rounded. They are marked by almost knoblike axial ribs, which extend from the anterior limit of the posterior sinus to the periphery. These ribs are almost as wide as the spaces that separate them. In addition to this the whorls are marked by sigmoid axial lines of growth. Of these ribs, 10 occur upon all but the penultimate and the body whorl, each of which has 12. The spiral sculpture consists of fine threads, which in the sinus portion near the summit of the early turns are about as strong as the spiral threads anterior to this, but on the later whorls these spiral threads become less strongly developed, while those anterior to it increase in strength. The anterior portion of the whorls on the later turns are marked by rather coarse, definitely spaced threads, between which finer spiral threads are present, varying in number from one to four. This fine sculpture, combined with the lines of growth, gives a reticulated pattern to the spiral grooves between the spiral cords. The base of the shell is short, well rounded, and marked like the anterior portion of the spire. The columella is very long, slender, marked by numerous slender, more or less equally spaced spiral threads, which become somewhat enfeebled near the tip. Between these stronger threads an occasional slender spiral thread is present. The aperture is tear-shaped with a very long anterior channel. The posterior channel is broad and deep, immediately below the summit. The inner lip is smooth, appearing as if excavated below the surface of the sculptural portion of the shell

== Distribution ==
This species occurs in the demersal zone of the Caribbean Sea and off Puerto Rico at depths between 146 m and 329 m.

It has also been found as a fossil in Miocene strata of the Chagres Sandstone (Panama); age range: 7.246 to 5.332 Ma
