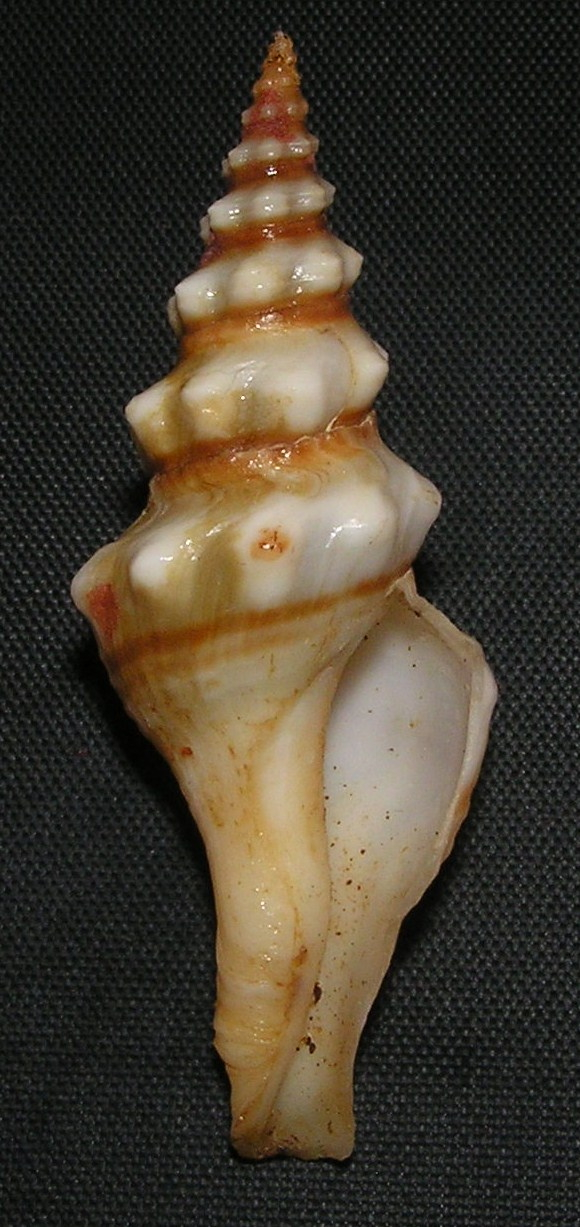
- Shell of Knefastia tuberculifera

Scientific classification
- Kingdom: Animalia
- Phylum: Mollusca
- Class: Gastropoda
- Subclass: Caenogastropoda
- Order: Neogastropoda
- Superfamily: Conoidea
- Family: Pseudomelatomidae
- Genus: Knefastia
- Species: K. tuberculifera

Binomial name
- Knefastia tuberculifera (Broderip & Sowerby I, 1829)

Synonyms
- Pleurotoma tuberculifera Broderip & Sowerby I, 1829

= Knefastia tuberculifera =

Species of gastropod

Knefastia tuberculifera is a species of sea snail, a marine gastropod mollusk in the family Pseudomelatomidae, the turrids and allies.

== Description ==
The length of the shell varies between 40 mm and 80 mm.

== Distribution ==
This marine species occurs in the Sea of Cortez, Western Mexico and down to Nicaragua.
