= Fusiturricula andrei =

Scientific classification
- Kingdom: Animalia
- Phylum: Mollusca
- Class: Gastropoda
- Subclass: Caenogastropoda
- Order: Neogastropoda
- Superfamily: Conoidea
- Family: Drilliidae
- Genus: Fusiturricula
- Species: F. andrei

Binomial name
- Fusiturricula andrei McLean & Poorman, 1971

Species of gastropod

Fusiturricula andrei is a species of sea snail, a marine gastropod mollusk in the family Drilliidae.

== Description ==
The size of an adult shell varies between 35 mm and 50 mm.

== Distribution ==
This species occurs in the demersal zone of the Pacific Ocean off Isla Santa Cruz, Galápagos Islands.
