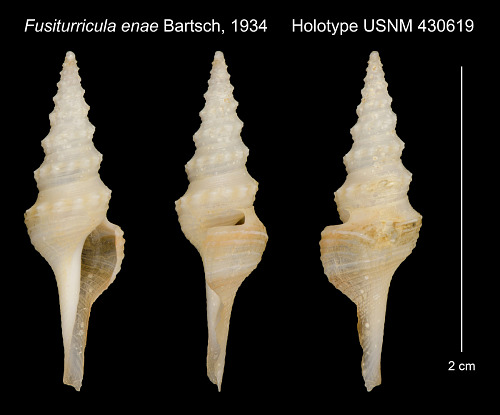
- Shell of Fusiturricula enae (from the Smithsonian National Museum of Natural History collection)

Scientific classification
- Kingdom: Animalia
- Phylum: Mollusca
- Class: Gastropoda
- Subclass: Caenogastropoda
- Order: Neogastropoda
- Superfamily: Conoidea
- Family: Drilliidae
- Genus: Fusiturricula
- Species: F. enae

Binomial name
- Fusiturricula enae Bartsch, 1934

= Fusiturricula enae =

Species of gastropod

Fusiturricula enae is a species of sea snail, a marine gastropod mollusk in the family Drilliidae.

== Description ==
The shell has a spindle-like form, and a pale horn color. The colour between each "spiral" is pale chestnut brown. The first "spirals" are cusp-like, and the following become increasingly more rounded and elongated. The shell grows to a length of 24 mm.

== Distribution ==
This species occurs in the demersal zone of the Caribbean Sea and off Puerto Rico at depths between 500 m and 550 m.
