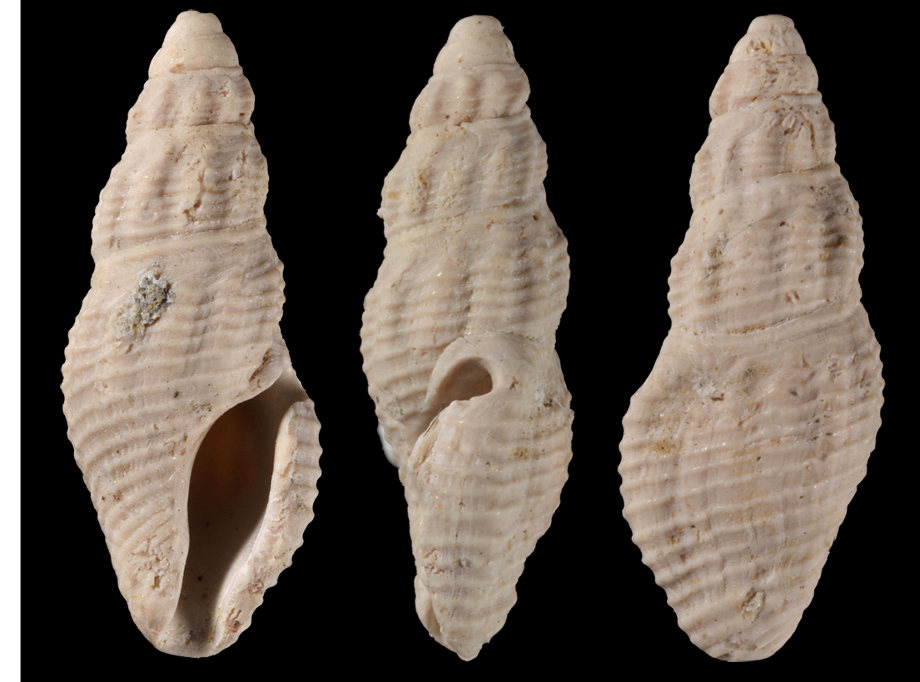
- Shell of Thelecythara oligocaenica (holotype at the MNHN, Paris)

Scientific classification
- Kingdom: Animalia
- Phylum: Mollusca
- Class: Gastropoda
- Subclass: Caenogastropoda
- Order: Neogastropoda
- Superfamily: Conoidea
- Family: Pseudomelatomidae
- Genus: Thelecythara
- Species: †T. oligocaenica

Binomial name
- †Thelecythara oligocaenica Lozouet, 2017

= Thelecythara oligocaenica =

Extinct species of gastropod

Thelecythara oligocaenica is an extinct species of sea snail, a marine gastropod mollusk. It is in the family Pseudomelatomidae, the turrids and allies.

== Distribution ==
Fossils of this species were found in the Adour Basin, Southwest France, France.
