= Fusiturricula acra =

Scientific classification
- Kingdom: Animalia
- Phylum: Mollusca
- Class: Gastropoda
- Subclass: Caenogastropoda
- Order: Neogastropoda
- Superfamily: Conoidea
- Family: Drilliidae
- Genus: Fusiturricula
- Species: F. acra

Binomial name
- Fusiturricula acra (Woodring, 1970)

Synonyms
- Pleurofusia acra Woodring, 1970

Species of gastropod

Fusiturricula acra is a species of sea snail, a marine gastropod mollusk in the family Drilliidae.

== Description ==
The size of an adult shell varies between 30 mm and 45 mm.

== Distribution ==
This marine species occurs off Colombia and Venezuela.

Fossils have been found in the Gatun formation, Panama.
