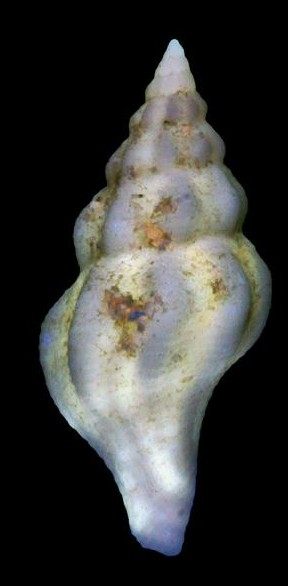
- Shell of Knefastia polygona (Specimen at MNHN, Paris)

Scientific classification
- Kingdom: Animalia
- Phylum: Mollusca
- Class: Gastropoda
- Subclass: Caenogastropoda
- Order: Neogastropoda
- Superfamily: Conoidea
- Family: Pseudomelatomidae
- Genus: Knefastia
- Species: K. polygona

Binomial name
- Knefastia polygona (G.P. Deshayes, 1834 )

Synonyms
- † Surcula polygona (Deshayes, 1834); † Turricula (Knefastia) polygona Deshayes, 1834

= Knefastia polygona =

Extinct species of gastropod

Knefastia polygona is an extinct species of sea snail, a marine gastropod mollusk in the family Pseudomelatomidae, the turrids and allies.

== Description ==
The length of the shell attains 20 mm.

== Distribution ==
This extinct marine species was found in Eocene (Lutetian) strata in the Paris Basin, France.
