= Fusiturricula maesae =

Scientific classification
- Kingdom: Animalia
- Phylum: Mollusca
- Class: Gastropoda
- Subclass: Caenogastropoda
- Order: Neogastropoda
- Superfamily: Conoidea
- Family: Drilliidae
- Genus: Fusiturricula
- Species: F. maesae

Binomial name
- Fusiturricula maesae Rios, 1985

Species of gastropod

Fusiturricula maesae is a species of sea snail, a marine gastropod mollusk in the family Drilliidae.

The specific name maesae is named in honor of American malacologist Virginia Orr Maes.

== Distribution ==
The type locality is in the demersal zone off Rio de Janeiro to São Paulo, Brazil. at a depth of 91 m.

== Description ==
The maximum recorded shell length is 54 mm.

== Habitat ==
Minimum recorded depth is 91 m. Maximum recorded depth is 91 m.
