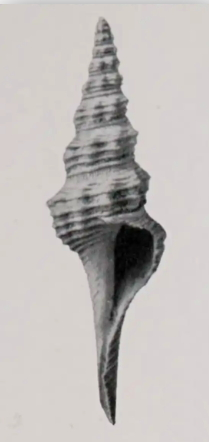
- Shell of Fusiturricula iole (holotype)

Scientific classification
- Kingdom: Animalia
- Phylum: Mollusca
- Class: Gastropoda
- Subclass: Caenogastropoda
- Order: Neogastropoda
- Superfamily: Conoidea
- Family: Drilliidae
- Genus: Fusiturricula
- Species: F. iole

Binomial name
- Fusiturricula iole Woodring, 1928

= Fusiturricula iole =

Species of gastropod

Fusiturricula iole is a species of sea snail, a marine gastropod mollusk in the family Drilliidae.

== Description ==
The size of an adult shell varies between 20 mm and 35 mm.

(original description) The shell is medium‑sized and very slender. The protoconch is moderately stout and consists of about one and three‑quarters whorls, with the last half‑whorl bulging near the anterior edge. The anterior canal is long and straight.

The sculpture consists of swollen axial ribs, ten on the body whorl, which are overridden by primary and secondary spiral threads. Four primary spirals run across the penultimate whorl, of which the peripheral spirals are the strongest. The anal fasciole is sculptured with a spiral thread adjoining the suture and with strong secondary threads.

The holotype measures 26.6 mm in length and 7.8 mm in diameter (outer lip broken).

== Distribution ==
This species occurs in the demersal zone of the Caribbean Sea off Venezuela and Trinidad.

It has also been found as a fossil in Pliocene strata of the Bowden Formation (Jamaica); age range: 3.6 to 2.588 Ma.
