= Fusiturricula panola =

Scientific classification
- Kingdom: Animalia
- Phylum: Mollusca
- Class: Gastropoda
- Subclass: Caenogastropoda
- Order: Neogastropoda
- Superfamily: Conoidea
- Family: Drilliidae
- Genus: Fusiturricula
- Species: F. panola

Binomial name
- Fusiturricula panola Woodring, 1928

Extinct species of gastropod

Fusiturricula panola is an extinct species of sea snail, a marine gastropod mollusc in the family Drilliidae.

== Description ==
The length of the shell attains 27.2 mm, its diameter 8.5 mm.

== Distribution ==
This marine species has been found as a fossil in Pliocene strata of the Bowden Formation (Jamaica); age range:3.6 to 2.588 Ma
