= Maesiella punctatostriata =

Scientific classification
- Kingdom: Animalia
- Phylum: Mollusca
- Class: Gastropoda
- Subclass: Caenogastropoda
- Order: Neogastropoda
- Superfamily: Conoidea
- Family: Pseudomelatomidae
- Genus: Maesiella
- Species: M. punctatostriata

Binomial name
- Maesiella punctatostriata (Carpenter, 1856)

Synonyms
- Crassispira solitaria Pilsbry, H.A. & H.N. Lowe, 1932; Drillia punctatostriata Carpenter, 1856; Maesiella solitaria (Pilsbry, H.A. & H.N. Lowe, 1932)

Species of gastropod

Maesiella punctatostriata is a species of sea snail, a marine gastropod mollusk in the family Pseudomelatomidae, the turrids and allies.

== Description ==
The length of the shell attains 18 mm.

== Distribution ==
This species occurs in the Pacific Ocean off Mazatlan, Mexico and off Panama.
