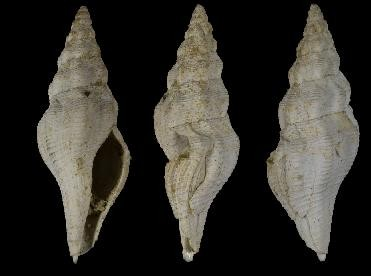
- Shell of Knefastia decipiens (specimens in MNHN, Paris)

Scientific classification
- Kingdom: Animalia
- Phylum: Mollusca
- Class: Gastropoda
- Subclass: Caenogastropoda
- Order: Neogastropoda
- Superfamily: Conoidea
- Family: Pseudomelatomidae
- Genus: Knefastia
- Species: K. decipiens

Binomial name
- Knefastia decipiens (G.P. Deshayes, 1865 )

Synonyms
- Surcula decipiens (Deshayes, 1865); Turricula (Knefastia) decipiens Deshayes, 1865

= Knefastia decipiens =

Extinct species of gastropod

Knefastia decipiens is an extinct species of sea snail, a marine gastropod mollusk in the family Pseudomelatomidae, the turrids and allies.

== Description ==
The length of the shell attains 20 mm.

== Distribution ==
This extinct marine species was found in Eocene strata in the Paris Basin, France.
