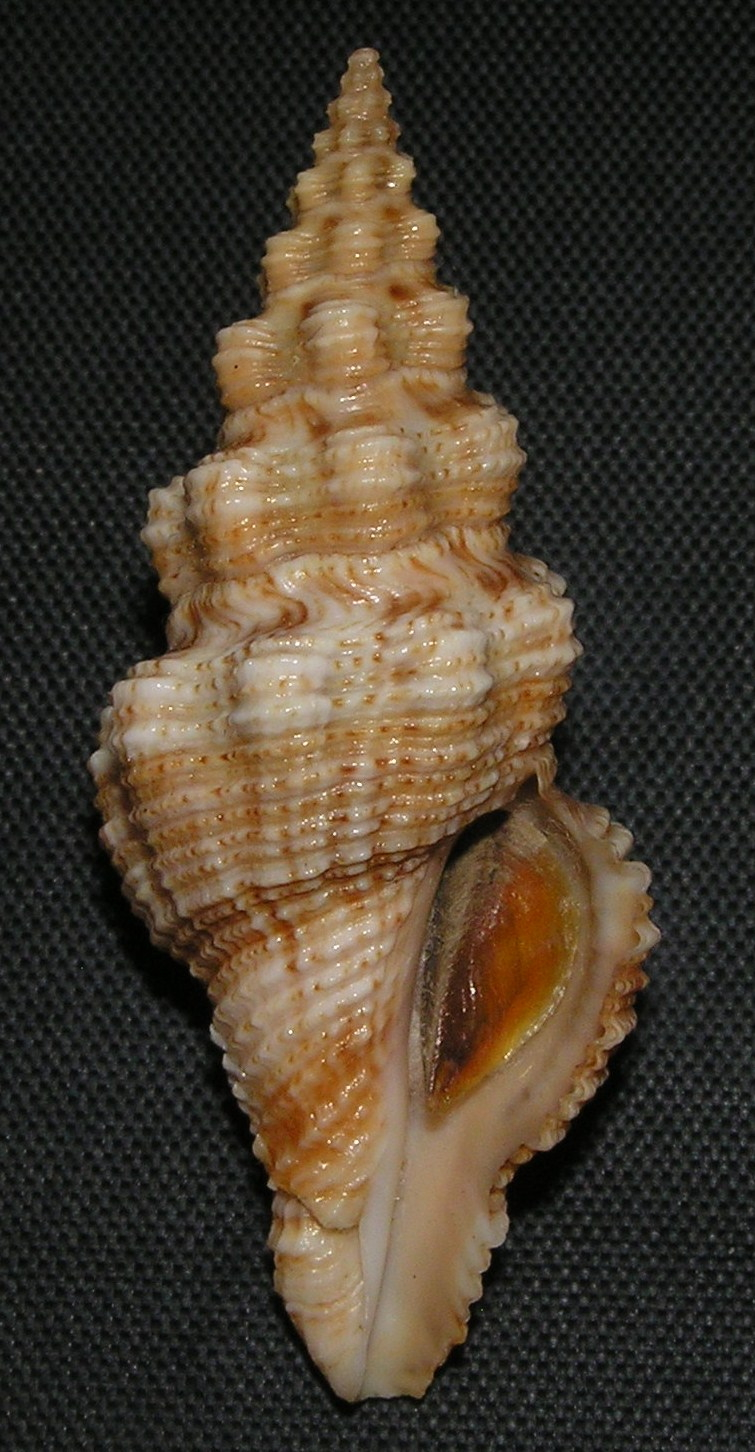
- Shell of Knefastia hilli

Scientific classification
- Kingdom: Animalia
- Phylum: Mollusca
- Class: Gastropoda
- Subclass: Caenogastropoda
- Order: Neogastropoda
- Superfamily: Conoidea
- Family: Pseudomelatomidae
- Genus: Knefastia
- Species: K. hilli

Binomial name
- Knefastia hilli Petuch, 1990

= Knefastia hilli =

Species of gastropod

Knefastia hilli is a species of sea snail, a marine gastropod mollusk in the family Pseudomelatomidae, the turrids and allies.

== Description ==
The length of the shell varies between 35 mm and 58 mm.

== Distribution ==
Knefastia hilli can be found on the Caribbean Sea coasts of Panama.
