= Fusiturricula taurina =

Scientific classification
- Kingdom: Animalia
- Phylum: Mollusca
- Class: Gastropoda
- Subclass: Caenogastropoda
- Order: Neogastropoda
- Superfamily: Conoidea
- Family: Drilliidae
- Genus: Fusiturricula
- Species: F. taurina

Binomial name
- Fusiturricula taurina (Olsson A., 1922)

Species of gastropod

Fusiturricula taurina is a species of sea snail, a marine gastropod mollusk in the family Drilliidae.

== Description ==
The size of an adult shell varies between 9 mm and 13 mm.

== Distribution ==
This species occurs in the demersal zone of Brazil.
