= Knefastia cubaguaensis =

Scientific classification
- Kingdom: Animalia
- Phylum: Mollusca
- Class: Gastropoda
- Subclass: Caenogastropoda
- Order: Neogastropoda
- Superfamily: Conoidea
- Family: Pseudomelatomidae
- Genus: Knefastia
- Species: †K. cubaguaensis

Binomial name
- †Knefastia cubaguaensis B.M. Landau, F. Da Silva & S.M. Heitz, 2016

Extinct species of gastropod

Knefastia cubaguaensis is an extinct species of sea snail, a marine gastropod mollusc in the family Pseudomelatomidae, the turrids and allies.

== Distribution ==
This extinct marine species was found in lower Pliocene strata in Venezuela.
