= Knefastia coislinensis =

Scientific classification
- Kingdom: Animalia
- Phylum: Mollusca
- Class: Gastropoda
- Subclass: Caenogastropoda
- Order: Neogastropoda
- Superfamily: Conoidea
- Family: Pseudomelatomidae
- Genus: Knefastia
- Species: K. coislinensis

Binomial name
- Knefastia coislinensis (Cossmann, 1898 )

Extinct species of gastropod

Knefastia coislinensis is an extinct species of sea snail, a marine gastropod mollusk in the family Pseudomelatomidae, the turrids and allies.

== Distribution ==
This extinct marine species was found in Eocene strata of the Loire inférieure, France.
