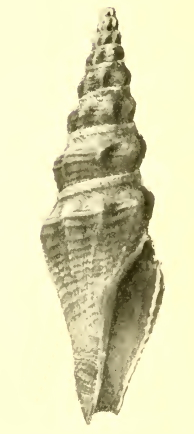
- Drawing of a shell of Knefastia nigricans (holotype)

Scientific classification
- Kingdom: Animalia
- Phylum: Mollusca
- Class: Gastropoda
- Subclass: Caenogastropoda
- Order: Neogastropoda
- Superfamily: Conoidea
- Family: Pseudomelatomidae
- Genus: Knefastia
- Species: K. nigricans

Binomial name
- Knefastia nigricans (W.H. Dall, 1919)

Synonyms
- Turricula (Knefastia) nigricans Dall, 1919 ·

= Knefastia nigricans =

Species of gastropod

Knefastia nigricans is a species of sea snail, a marine gastropod mollusk in the family Pseudomelatomidae, the turrids and allies.

== Description ==
(Original description) The slender, acute shell is blackish brown with the anterior part of the body whorl pale reddish brown. It has a conspicuous periostracum and a closely appressed suture separated by a single cord from the constricted anal fascicle. It contains nine whorls, without the (lost) protoconch. The axial sculpture consists of (on the body whorl eight) prominent angular ribs with wider interspaces, beginning abruptly at the shoulder rapidly dwindling anteriorly and obsolete on the base. These ribs are crossed by (on the body whorl about 14) widely spaced slender cords, slightly nodulous at the intersections. The aperture is narrow. The anal sulcus is shallow. The outer lip is sharp, simple and with a slight subsutural callus. The inner lip is erased. The columella is straight. The siphonal canal is wide and very slightly recurved.

== Distribution ==
This marine species occurs in the Pacific Ocean off Lower California.
