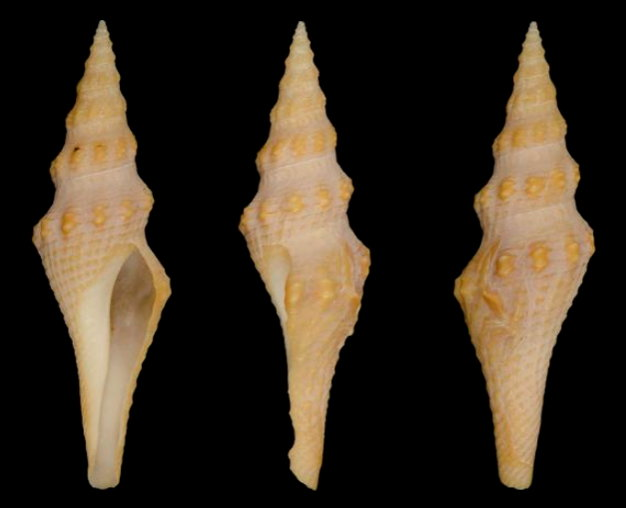
- Shell of Fusiturricula sunderlandi (holotype at the Smithsonian Institution)

Scientific classification
- Kingdom: Animalia
- Phylum: Mollusca
- Class: Gastropoda
- Subclass: Caenogastropoda
- Order: Neogastropoda
- Superfamily: Conoidea
- Family: Drilliidae
- Genus: Fusiturricula
- Species: F. sunderlandi

Binomial name
- Fusiturricula sunderlandi Petuch, 1990

= Fusiturricula sunderlandi =

Species of gastropod

Fusiturricula sunderlandi is a species of sea snail, a marine gastropod mollusk in the family Drilliidae.

== Description ==
Their shell grows to a length of 33 mm. The species was discovered in 1990.

== Distribution ==
This species occurs in the demersal zone of the Caribbean Sea off Panama at a depth of 70 m.
