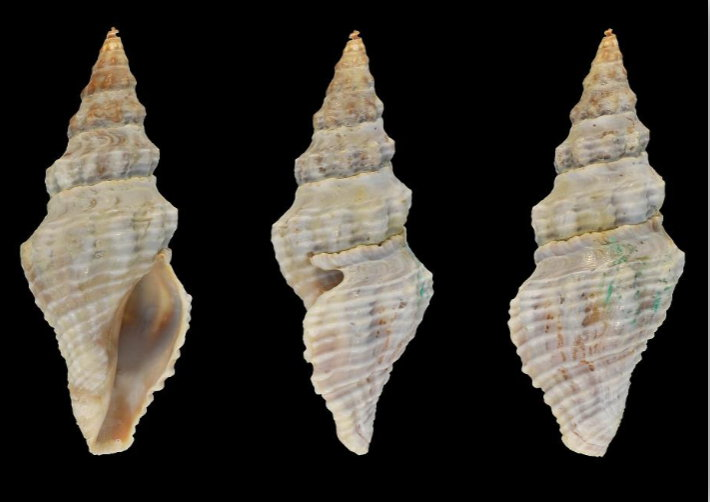
- Knefastia dalli

Scientific classification
- Kingdom: Animalia
- Phylum: Mollusca
- Class: Gastropoda
- Subclass: Caenogastropoda
- Order: Neogastropoda
- Superfamily: Conoidea
- Family: Pseudomelatomidae
- Genus: Knefastia; Dall, 1919

Type species
- Pleurotoma olivacea Sowerby I, 1834

Species
- See text

= Knefastia =

Genus of gastropods

Knefastia is a genus of sea snails, marine gastropod mollusks in the family Pseudomelatomidae.

== Taxonomy ==
This genus was previously included in the subfamily Cochlespirinae of the family Turridae.

== Species ==
Species within the genus Knefastia include:

- † Knefastia aenigmatica Landau, Da Silva & Heitz, 2016
- Knefastia altenai Macsotay & Campos Villarroel, 2001
- † Knefastia chira Olsson, 1931
- †Knefastia coislinensis (Cossman, 1898)
- † Knefastia crassinoda (Des Moulins, 1842)
- † Knefastia cubaguaensis Landau, Da Silva & Heitz, 2016
- Knefastia dalli Bartsch, 1944
- † Knefastia decipiens (Deshayes, 1865)
- † Knefastia etteri Landau, Da Silva & Heitz, 2016
- Knefastia funiculata (Kiener, 1840)
- † Knefastia glypta Gardner, 1937
- Knefastia hilli Petuch, 1990
- Knefastia howelli (Hertlein & Strong, 1951)
- † Knefastia kugleri Jung, 1965
- † Knefastia limonensis Olsson, 1922
- † Knefastia lindae Petuch, 1994
- Knefastia nigricans (Dall, 1919)
- Knefastia olivacea (Sowerby I, 1834)
- † Knefastia polygona (Deshayes, 1834)
- Knefastia princeps Berry, 1953
- † Knefastia rouaulti (Cossmann, 1923)
- † Knefastia sainti (de Boury, 1899)
- Knefastia tuberculifera (Broderip & Sowerby I, 1829)
- Knefastia walkeri Berry, 1958
- † Knefastia waltonia Gardner, 1937

Species brought into synonymy

- Knefastia horrenda (Watson, 1886): synonym of Stenodrillia horrenda (R. B. Watson, 1886)
- † Knefastia lavinoides Olsson, 1922: synonym of † Knefastia limonensis Olsson, 1922
