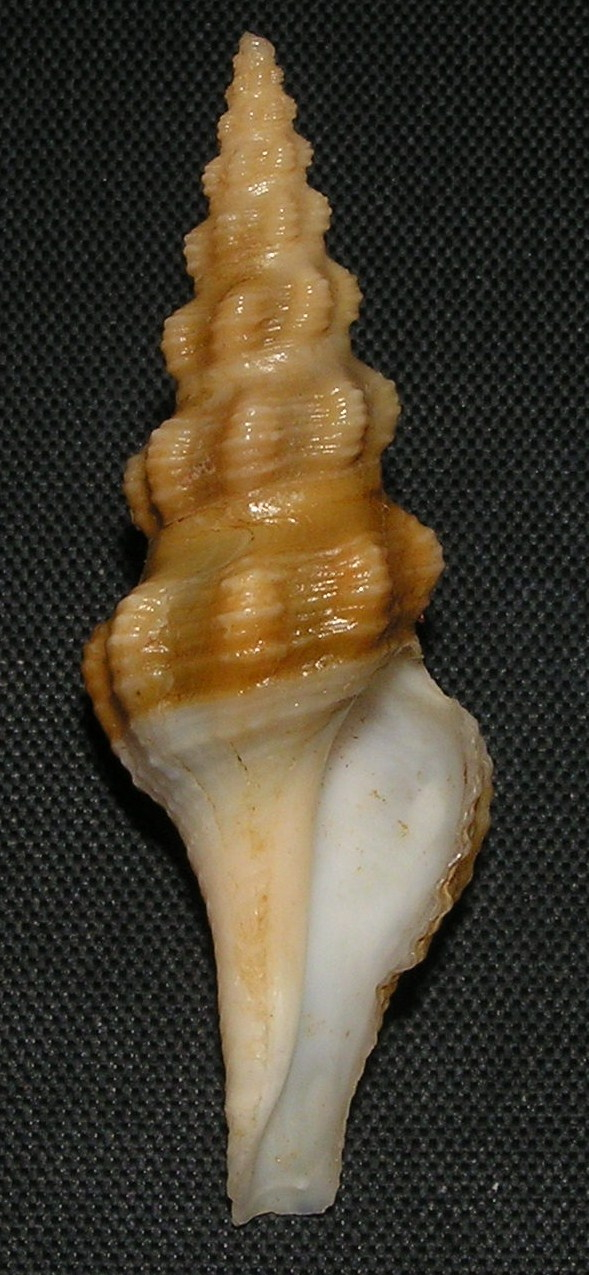
- Shell of Knefastia walkeri

Scientific classification
- Kingdom: Animalia
- Phylum: Mollusca
- Class: Gastropoda
- Subclass: Caenogastropoda
- Order: Neogastropoda
- Superfamily: Conoidea
- Family: Pseudomelatomidae
- Genus: Knefastia
- Species: K. walkeri

Binomial name
- Knefastia walkeri Berry, 1958

= Knefastia walkeri =

Species of gastropod

Knefastia walkeri is a species of sea snail, a marine gastropod mollusk in the family Pseudomelatomidae, the turrids and allies.

== Description ==
The length of the shell varies between 37 mm and 67 mm.

== Distribution ==
This species occurs in the Sea of Cortez, Western Mexico
