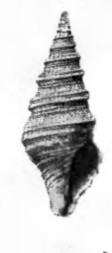
- Original image of a shell of Knefastia waltonia

Scientific classification
- Kingdom: Animalia
- Phylum: Mollusca
- Class: Gastropoda
- Subclass: Caenogastropoda
- Order: Neogastropoda
- Superfamily: Conoidea
- Family: Pseudomelatomidae
- Genus: Knefastia
- Species: K. waltonia

Binomial name
- Knefastia waltonia J. Gardner, 1937

= Knefastia waltonia =

Extinct species of gastropod

Knefastia waltonia is an extinct species of sea snail, a marine gastropod mollusc in the family Pseudomelatomidae, the turrids and allies.

== Description ==
The length of the shell attains 38 mm, its diameter 11.4 mm.

(Original description) The shell is of moderate size for the genus, fusiform, with the maximum diameter in front of the median horizontal. The aperture is approximately half the total altitude. The shell contains about 11 whorls. The protoconch is small but rather high, twice coiled. The initial turn is erect, submerged only at the extreme tip and slightly bulbous. The succeeding volution is high, increasingly compressed laterally. The line of demarcation between the conch and the protoconch is defined by the initiation of a faint peripheral ridge a little in front of the median line of the whorl, a ridge which becomes increasingly prominent and near the end of the first whorl of the conch is defined by a faint sulcus and threadlet behind it. A feeble spiral is also introduced near the end of the first whorl directly behind the anterior suture line and within half a turn, another directly in front of the posterior suture, neither one of them attaining any prominence. The adult whorls are bicarinate, the spiral directly behind the periphery increasing in strength until it is almost or quite as elevated as the peripheral keel, from which it is separated by a rather narrow, concave interspiral area. This is sculptured with protractive incrementals and in places a fortuitous spiral threadlet. The area between the suture and the posterior keel is strongly concave, sculptured with 2 faint spirals, both of them introduced near the beginning of the conch, the one a little in front of the suture, the other at an equal distance behind the posterior carina, and between them a smoothly concave interspace striated with strongly and symmetrically arcuate incrementals and a few very faint spiral lirae. Microscopic spirals are also present directly in front of the posterior suture and on the concave space between the anterior keel and the anterior suture. Two additional primaries are shown equal in prominence and spacing to the carinal spirals, upon the body, and about 12 similar primaries, regularly spaced and gradually decreasing in size anteriorly, upon the very base of the body and the columella. Secondaries are intercalated on the columella, in some specimens as many as 3 between a single pair of primaries, and a very fine threading upon the fasciole. The suture line is distinct but inconspicuous, overhung by the periphery. The aperture is pyriform, abruptly expanding posteriorly. The siphonal notch is placed midway between the posterior carina and the suture line, U-shaped, with parallel sides, the anterior limb more produced than the posterior. The parietal wall is thinly glazed. The anterior canal is long, very slightly curved, with proximate parallel margins.

== Distribution ==
This extinct marine species was found in Miocene strata in the Alum Bluff Formation of Florida, United States.
