= Thelecythara dushanae =

Scientific classification
- Kingdom: Animalia
- Phylum: Mollusca
- Class: Gastropoda
- Subclass: Caenogastropoda
- Order: Neogastropoda
- Superfamily: Conoidea
- Family: Pseudomelatomidae
- Genus: Thelecythara
- Species: T. dushanae

Binomial name
- Thelecythara dushanae McLean & Poorman, 1971

Species of gastropod

Thelecythara dushanae is a species of sea snail, a marine gastropod mollusk in the family Pseudomelatomidae, the turrids and allies.

== Distribution ==
This species occurs in the Sea of Cortez, Western Mexico
