= Knefastia crassinoda =

Scientific classification
- Kingdom: Animalia
- Phylum: Mollusca
- Class: Gastropoda
- Subclass: Caenogastropoda
- Order: Neogastropoda
- Superfamily: Conoidea
- Family: Pseudomelatomidae
- Genus: Knefastia
- Species: K. crassinoda

Binomial name
- Knefastia crassinoda (Desmoulins, 1842)

Synonyms
- Turricula (Knefastia) crassinoda (Desmoulins, 1842)

Extinct species of gastropod

Knefastia crassinoda is an extinct species of sea snail, a marine gastropod mollusk in the family Pseudomelatomidae, the turrids and allies.

== Distribution ==
This extinct marine species was found in Stampien strata in the Basses-Pyrénées, France.
