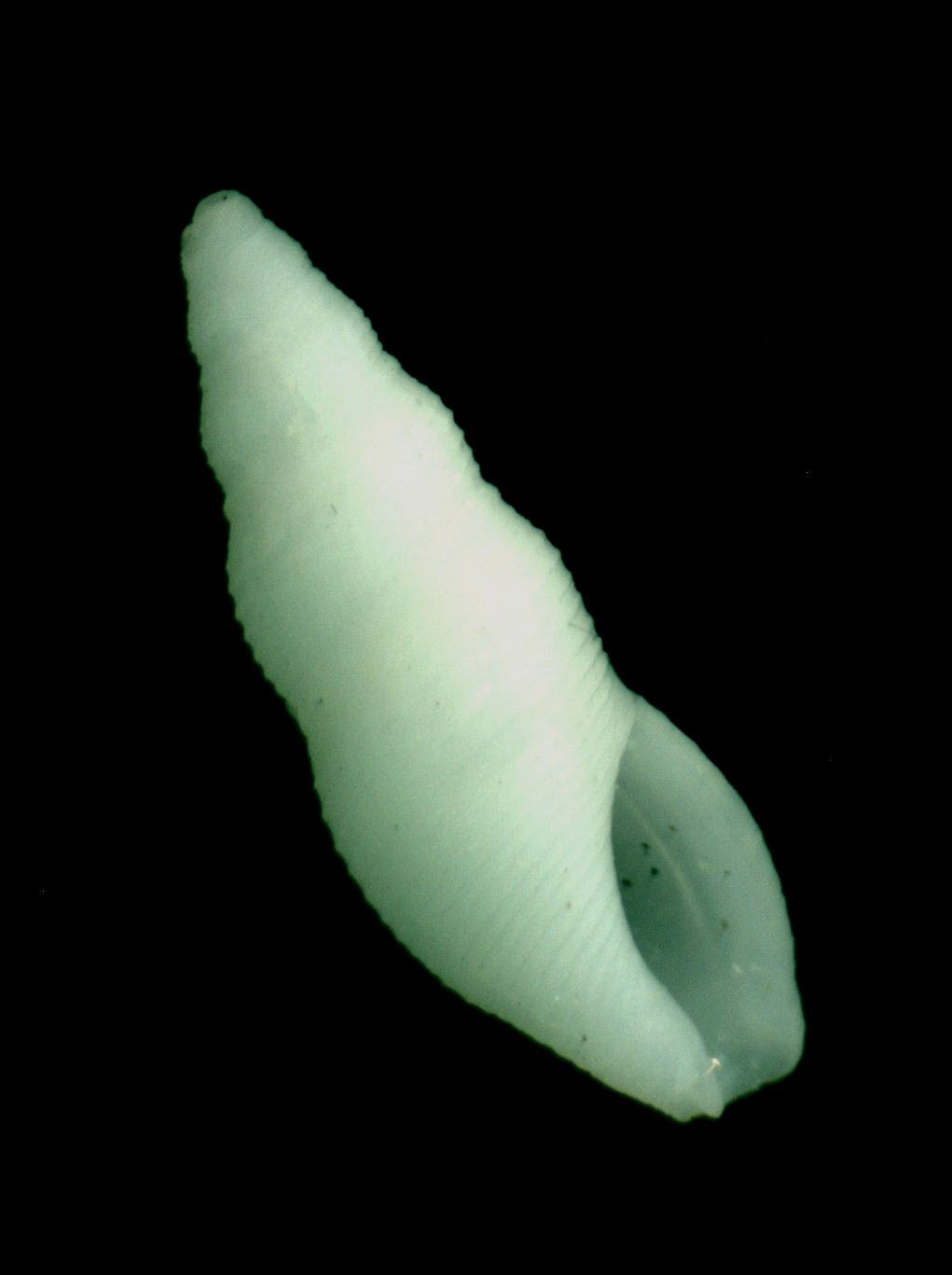
- Shell of Maesiella maesae

Scientific classification
- Kingdom: Animalia
- Phylum: Mollusca
- Class: Gastropoda
- Subclass: Caenogastropoda
- Order: Neogastropoda
- Superfamily: Conoidea
- Family: Pseudomelatomidae
- Genus: Maesiella
- Species: M. maesae

Binomial name
- Maesiella maesae McLean & Poorman, 1971

= Maesiella maesae =

Species of gastropod

Maesiella maesae is a species of sea snail, a marine gastropod mollusk in the family Pseudomelatomidae, the turrids and allies.

The generic name Maesiella as well as the specific name maesae are named in honor of American malacologist Virginia Orr Maes.

== Description ==
The length of the shell attains 6 mm.

== Distribution ==
This species occurs in the Pacific Ocean off Mexico to Panama.
