= Knefastia kugleri =

Scientific classification
- Kingdom: Animalia
- Phylum: Mollusca
- Class: Gastropoda
- Subclass: Caenogastropoda
- Order: Neogastropoda
- Superfamily: Conoidea
- Family: Pseudomelatomidae
- Genus: Knefastia
- Species: K. kugleri

Binomial name
- Knefastia kugleri P.O. Jung, 1965

Extinct species of gastropod

Knefastia kugleri is an extinct species of sea snail, a marine gastropod mollusc in the family Pseudomelatomidae, the turrids and allies.

== Description ==
The length of the shell attains 52 mm.

== Distribution ==
This extinct marine species was found in upper middle Miocene strata in the Paraguana Peninsula, Venezuela.
