= Fusiturricula notilla =

Scientific classification
- Kingdom: Animalia
- Phylum: Mollusca
- Class: Gastropoda
- Subclass: Caenogastropoda
- Order: Neogastropoda
- Superfamily: Conoidea
- Family: Drilliidae
- Genus: Fusiturricula
- Species: F. notilla

Binomial name
- Fusiturricula notilla (Dall, 1908)

Synonyms
- Turris notilla W.H. Dall, 1908; Turris (Surcula) notilla Dall, 1908

Species of gastropod

Fusiturricula notilla is a species of sea snail, a marine gastropod mollusk in the family Drilliidae.

The database Gastropods.com considers this species a synonym of Hindsiclava militaris (Reeve, L.A., 1843)

== Description ==
The length of an adult shell attains 26 mm, its diameter 9 mm.

(Original description) The small, solid shell has a fusiform shape. The spire is acute and slightly longer than the aperture. It contains ten whorls, beside the (lost) protoconch. It is covered with a conspicuous olivaceous periostracum. The suture is appressed, with a strong spiral cord between it and the somewhat excavated anal fasciole which is sculptured by several sharp spiral incised lines. From the shoulder extend about eighteen slightly protractive axial rounded riblets, stoutest at the shoulder, diminishing forward, and extending nearly to the siphonal canal, with narrower interspaces. These are crossed by about eighteen larger spiral cords on the body whorl, seven of which are on the body of the whorl and the rest on the beak and the siphonal canal. The former are turgid where they cross the ribs, and in the interspaces have one to three much finer threads. The latter are more or less undulate, but have hardly any or no spiral secondary threads. The anal sulcus is shallow and wide. The aperture is rather narrow The thin outer lip is produced and simple. The whitish columellar lip is smoot. The columella is straight and obliquely attenuated in front. The siphonal canal is rather short and wide.

== Distribution ==
This marine species occurs off the Sea of Cortez, Western Mexico
