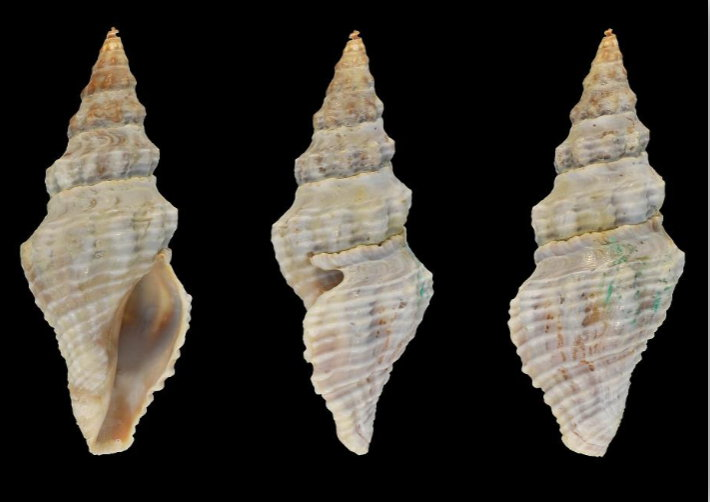
- Shell of Knefastia dalli (holotype at the Smithsonian Institution)

Scientific classification
- Kingdom: Animalia
- Phylum: Mollusca
- Class: Gastropoda
- Subclass: Caenogastropoda
- Order: Neogastropoda
- Superfamily: Conoidea
- Family: Pseudomelatomidae
- Genus: Knefastia
- Species: K. dalli

Binomial name
- Knefastia dalli Bartsch, 1944

= Knefastia dalli =

Species of gastropod

Knefastia dalli, common name Dall's turrid, is a species of sea snail, a marine gastropod mollusk in the family Pseudomelatomidae, the turrids and allies.

== Taxonomy ==
Knefastia dalli was described by the American malacologist Paul Bartsch in 1944, in the Proceedings of the Biological Society of Washington. Bartsch introduced the name for the Gulf of California shell that Reeve had figured in 1843 as "Pleurotoma funiculata", a name preoccupied by Pleurotoma funiculata Kiener, 1839.

== Description ==
The shell is very broadly fusiform and is 40 to 70 mm in length. It is covered by an olivaceous periostracum, sometimes tinged with brown; when this is removed the shell is pinkish-white, variously variegated, blotched and streaked with brown. The protoconch consists of a single smooth whorl. On the later whorls, an impressed line a little below the summit gives the appearance of a cord; the concave area between the summit and the suture bears strongly retractive growth lines marking the filled-in sinus, while the rest of each whorl carries strong nodulose axial ribs crossed by four spiral cords (three of them equal). About 8 nodules occur on the early whorls and 12 on the penultimate whorl. The rounded part of the base has three strong, evenly spaced spiral cords, and the siphonal canal bears about 12 cords that become progressively weaker and more closely spaced. The aperture is narrowly pear-shaped with an acute posterior angle; the thin outer lip is made sinuous by the spiral cords and has a distinct sinus just below the summit. The operculum is claw-shaped, and the radula has a small central tooth and Y-shaped marginal teeth. The holotype, from the Gulf of California, retains 7.5 postnuclear whorls and has a greater diameter of 24.5 mm and an aperture 30.7 mm long.

== Distribution ==
This marine species occurs in the Gulf of California (Sea of Cortez), off western Mexico.
