= Knefastia howelli =

Scientific classification
- Kingdom: Animalia
- Phylum: Mollusca
- Class: Gastropoda
- Subclass: Caenogastropoda
- Order: Neogastropoda
- Superfamily: Conoidea
- Family: Pseudomelatomidae
- Genus: Knefastia
- Species: K. howelli

Binomial name
- Knefastia howelli (Hertlein & Strong, 1951)

Synonyms
- Fusiturricula howelli Hertlein & Strong, 1951

Species of gastropod

Knefastia howelli is a species of sea snail, a marine gastropod mollusk in the family Pseudomelatomidae, the turrids and allies.

== Description ==
The length of the shell attains 31 mm, its diameter 11 mm.

== Distribution ==
This species occurs in the Pacific Ocean off Costa Rica.
