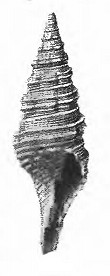
- Original image of a shell of Knefastia glypta

Scientific classification
- Kingdom: Animalia
- Phylum: Mollusca
- Class: Gastropoda
- Subclass: Caenogastropoda
- Order: Neogastropoda
- Superfamily: Conoidea
- Family: Pseudomelatomidae
- Genus: Knefastia
- Species: K. glypta

Binomial name
- Knefastia glypta J. Gardner, 1937

= Knefastia glypta =

Extinct species of gastropod

Knefastia glypta is an extinct species of sea snail, a marine gastropod mollusc in the family Pseudomelatomidae, the turrids and allies.

== Description ==
The length of the shell attains 25.3 mm, its diameter 8 mm.

(Original description) The slender, fusiform shells has a moderate size. The aperture is a little less than half as high as the entire shell. The shell contains approximately 11 whorls in the adult, increasing regularly in size. The protoconch is obtuse and rather elevated, thrice coiled. The initial volution is smooth, polished, largely submerged. The succeeding whorls turn inflated but gradually flattening away from the apex. The final turn of the protoconch is compressed laterally, sculptured with crowded asymmetrically arcuate axial riblets, about 20 to the whorl, extending from the posterior suture to the periphery, which is cut off from the anterior suture by a rather deep linear channel. The beginning of the conch is marked by the initiation of 5 spiral lirae, the posterior of which is the broadest, and the anterior, which outlines the periphery, the most elevated. The sculpture is modified on the later volutions by the increasing prominence of the peripheral spiral and that directly behind it, the intercalation of secondaries, and the development of undulatory axials 8 to 10 to the whorl. These are indicated chiefly in the crenulation of the peripheral spirals. The periphery of antepenult whorls is situated a little more than one third of the distance across from the anterior to the posterior suture, outlined by a simple elevated spiral cord. A second spiral of similar character and almost equal elevation is a short distance behind it, the two separated from one another by a shallow interspace in which a medial secondary and two microscopically fine tertiaries are symmetrically intercalated. Both of the peripheral spirals are broadly and regularly scalloped by the axial undulations. The area between the posterior peripheral primary and the posterior suture is feebly concave, lirated with a strongly elevated primary directly in front of the suture and 3 equal and closely spaced secondaries between the posterior primary and the posterior peripheral spiral. A microscopically fine tertiary in some specimens is introduced directly behind the periphery. A strong secondary and two or more tertiaries are usually developed between the anterior peripheral spiral and the spiral upon which the suture revolves. The body whorl in front of the periphery is lirated to the anterior siphonal fasciole with about 12 elevated cords, regular in size and spacing, becoming increasingly less prominent and less distant anteriorly, with 2 to 4 threadlets intercalated between each pair, the medial thread usually the least feeble. The anterior fasciole is also obscurely threaded. The suture line is very inconspicuous. The aperture is mutilated in all available specimens, narrowly pyriform, expanding slightly posteriorly. The outer lip is widely flaring incrementally, narrowly but deeply sinuated in front of the anterior primary, distantly lirated within. The lirae are not persistent to the margin. The parietal wall is thinly glazed, not entirely concealing the lirae upon the base of the body and the columella, which continue far within the aperture. The anterior canal is short, recurved, with parallel proximate margins.

== Distribution ==
This extinct marine species was found in Miocene strata in the Alum Bluff Formation of Florida, United States.
