= Fusiturricula springvaleensis =

Scientific classification
- Kingdom: Animalia
- Phylum: Mollusca
- Class: Gastropoda
- Subclass: Caenogastropoda
- Order: Neogastropoda
- Superfamily: Conoidea
- Family: Drilliidae
- Genus: Fusiturricula
- Species: F. springvaleensis

Binomial name
- Fusiturricula springvaleensis Mansfield 1925

Synonyms
- Clavatula (Fusiturricula) bajanensis Nowell-Usticke 1969; Clavatula (Fusiturricula) pagodula Rustch 1934; Fusiturricula altenai Macsotay and Campos 2001; Fusuturricula (Kenfastia) bajanensis Nowell-Usticke 1969

Extinct species of gastropod

Fusiturricula springvaleensis is an extinct species of sea snail, a marine gastropod mollusk in the family Drilliidae.

== Description ==
The shell grows to a length of 44 mm, its diameter is 15 mm.

== Distribution ==
This extinct species was found in Miocene strata of Trinidad and Tobago and in Pliocene strata of Venezuela; age range: 5.332 to 2.588 Ma.
