= Virginia Orr Maes =

Virginia Orr Maes (1920–1986) was an American malacologist associated with the Academy of Natural Sciences of Philadelphia. Thanks to her collecting, the academy has an exceptionally fine collection of turrids. She married Robert A. Maes in 1963. They had no children.

A bibliography of Virginia Orr Maes was written by the malacologist Robert Robertson in 1987.

== Taxa named in honor ==
Gastropods named in honor of Virginia Orr Maes include one genus, six species and one subspecies:

- Genus Maesiella McLean in McLean & Poorman, 1971
- Anarithma maesi Drivas & Jay, 1986
- Fusiturricula maesae Rios, 1985
- Maesiella maesae McLean & Poorman, 1971
- Pugnus maesae Roth, 1972
- Simnia maesae Cate, 1973
- Taheitia orrae Turner, 1959
- Subspecies Strombus urceus orrae Abbott, 1960 - now considered to be a synonym of Canarium urceus urceus (Linnaeus, 1758)
