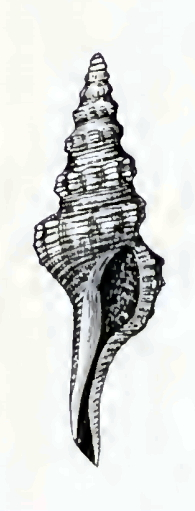
- Original image of a shell of Fusiturricula fusinella

Scientific classification
- Kingdom: Animalia
- Phylum: Mollusca
- Class: Gastropoda
- Subclass: Caenogastropoda
- Order: Neogastropoda
- Superfamily: Conoidea
- Family: Drilliidae
- Genus: Fusiturricula
- Species: F. fusinella

Binomial name
- Fusiturricula fusinella (W.H. Dall, 1908)

Synonyms
- Surcula fusinella W.H. Dall, 1908; Turris (Surcula) fusinella W.H. Dall, 1908 (basionym)

= Fusiturricula fusinella =

Species of gastropod

Fusiturricula fusinella is a species of sea snail, a marine gastropod mollusk in the family Drilliidae.

== Description ==
The size of an adult shell varies between 17 mm and 60 mm.

(Original description) The small, slender, delicate shell is white with a faint suffusion toward the periphery of pale pinkish. It contains ten or more whorls. The spire is acute, a little shorter than the aperture. The protoconch consists of three elevated whorls, milk-white, glassy, smooth, abruptly changing to the adult type of sculpture. The fifth whorl shows seven, the ninth with ten, short axial ribs, chiefly visible on the periphery, crossed by two strong spiral cords, more or less turgid at the intersections. The whorl above these cords is somewhat excavated with a nearly smooth surface except for lines of growth and three or four spiral threads, more distinct and numerous on the later whorls. The base is bordered by a prominent cord on which the suture is laid, giving the effect of a presutural ridge just behind the anal fasciole. On the base there are about 20 more cords with a tendency to alternate in size. The whole surface has minute spiral striae and lines of growth which form a microscopic reticulation only visible with a good lens. The aperture is rounded. The siphonal canal is long and slender. The body is polished and the sculpture eroded. The columella is white, callous, obliquely truncate in front, slightly twisted and impervious. The outer lip is thin, simple. The anal sulcus is wide and shallow.

== Distribution ==
This species occurs in the demersal zone of the Eastern Pacific Ocean off the Galapagos Islands and from the Gulf of California, Western Mexico, to Panama.
