= Fusiturricula jaquensis =

Surinam turrid

Scientific classification
- Kingdom: Animalia
- Phylum: Mollusca
- Class: Gastropoda
- Subclass: Caenogastropoda
- Order: Neogastropoda
- Superfamily: Conoidea
- Family: Drilliidae
- Genus: Fusiturricula
- Species: F. jaquensis

Binomial name
- Fusiturricula jaquensis (Sowerby I, 1850)

Synonyms
- Knefastia paulettae Princz, D., 1978; Pleurotoma jaquensis Sowerby I, 1850; Surcula jaquensis (Sowerby I, 1850)

Species of gastropod

Fusiturricula jaquensis, common name the Surinam turrid, is a species from Fusiturricula, a genus of sea snails, gastropod mollusk in the family of Drilliidae.

== Description ==
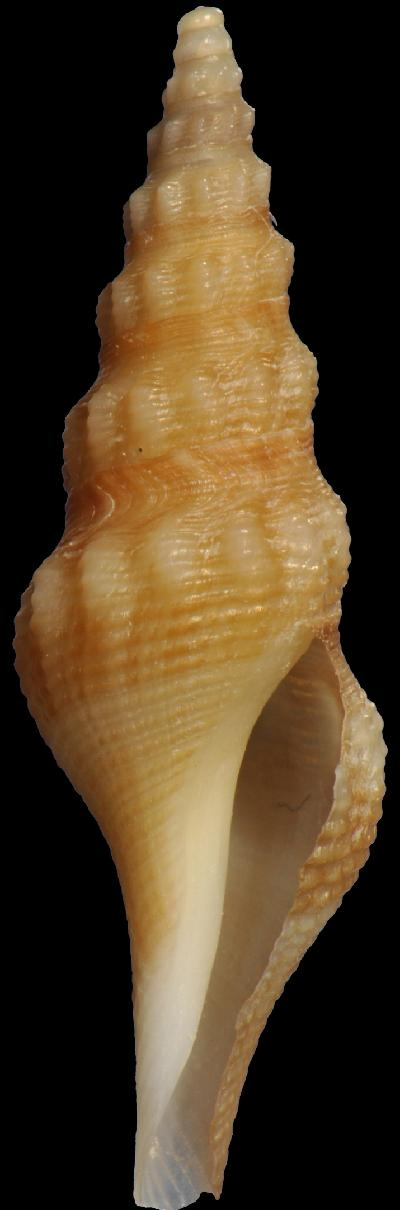
Fusiturricula Jaquensis

Fusiturricula Jaquensis has a spiral-shaped structure with a calcified shell, the size of an adult shell varying between 35mm to 85mm. The shell has a white color with orange streaks running through. Variables include a more conical-shape, the presence of bumps and differences in color. It has a soft, unsegmented body composed of mostly muscle.

== Distribution ==
This species occurs in the demersal zone from Colombia to Northern Brazil.

It has also been found as a fossil in Miocene strata of Venezuela; age range: 20.43 to 15.97 Ma.
