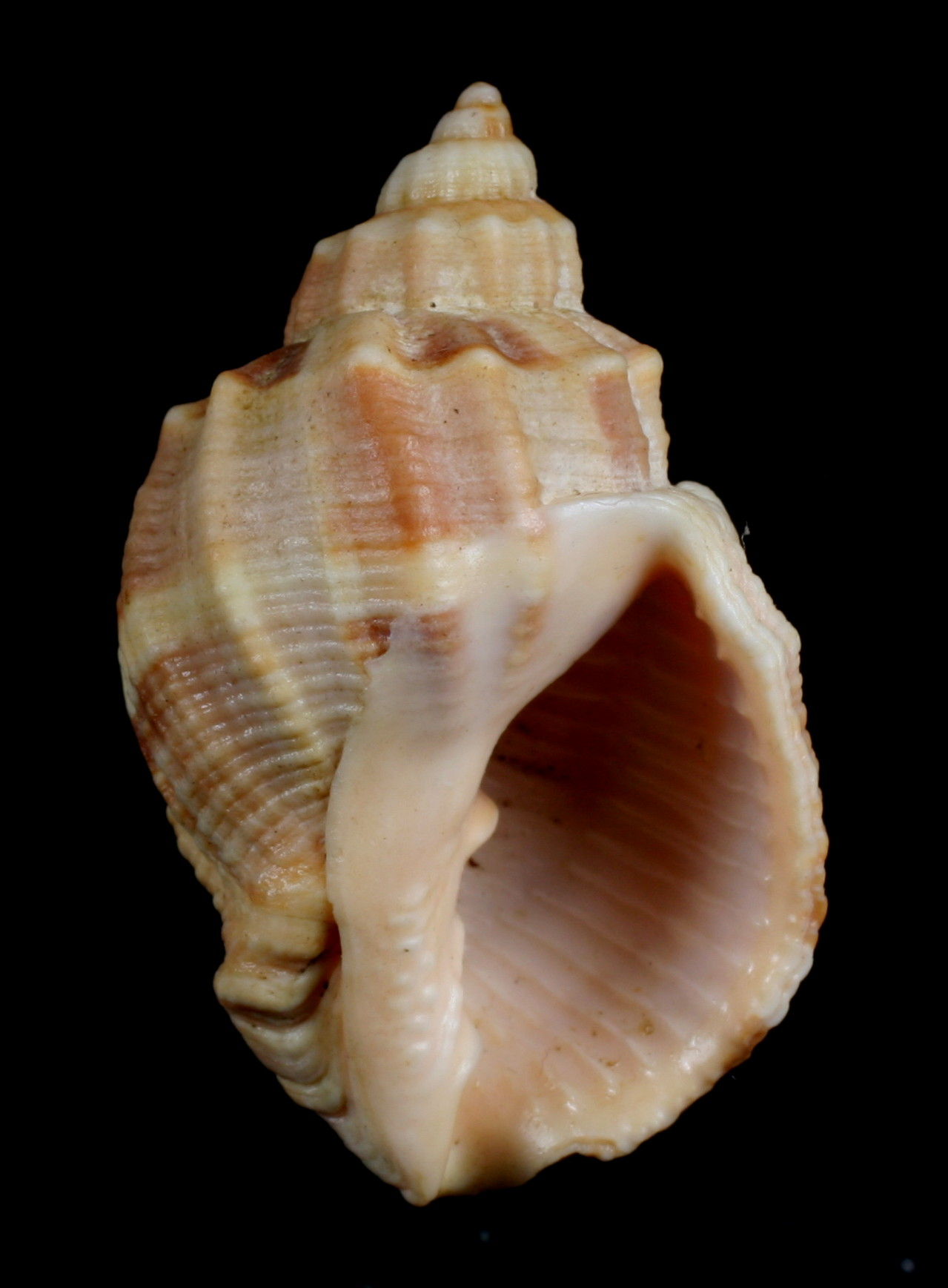
- Apertural view of shell of Sydaphera spengleriana (Deshayes, 1830)

Scientific classification
- Kingdom: Animalia
- Phylum: Mollusca
- Class: Gastropoda
- Subclass: Caenogastropoda
- Order: Neogastropoda
- Superfamily: Volutoidea
- Family: Cancellariidae
- Genus: Sydaphera; Iredale, 1929

Type species
- Sydaphera renovata Iredale, 1929

= Sydaphera =

Genus of gastropods

Sydaphera is a genus of sea snails, marine gastropod mollusks in the family Cancellariidae, the nutmeg snails.

== Species ==
Species within the genus Sydaphera include:

- Sydaphera anxifer (Iredale, 1925)
- Sydaphera australis (G.B. Sowerby I, 1832)
- Sydaphera christiana Verhecken, 2008
- Sydaphera delicosa Laseron, 1955
- Sydaphera fulva (Lee & Lan, 2002)
- Sydaphera granosa (G.B. Sowerby I, 1832b)
- Sydaphera lactea (Deshayes, 1830) :
- Sydaphera obnixa (Iredale, 1936)
- Sydaphera panamuna (Garrard, 1975) :
- Sydaphera spengleriana (Deshayes, 1830)
- Sydaphera tasmanica (Tenison-Woods, 1876)

Synonyms

- Sydaphera gigantea (Lee & Lan, 2002): synonym of Merica (Sydaphera) gigantea (Y.-C. Lee & T. C. Lan, 2002) represented as Merica gigantea (Y.-C. Lee & T. C. Lan, 2002)
- Sydaphera purpuriformis (Kiener, 1841): synonym of Merica purpuriformis (Kiener, 1841)
- Sydaphera undulata (G.B. Sowerby II, 1849): accepted as Merica (Sydaphera) undulata (G. B. Sowerby II, 1849) represented as Merica undulata (G. B. Sowerby II, 1849)
