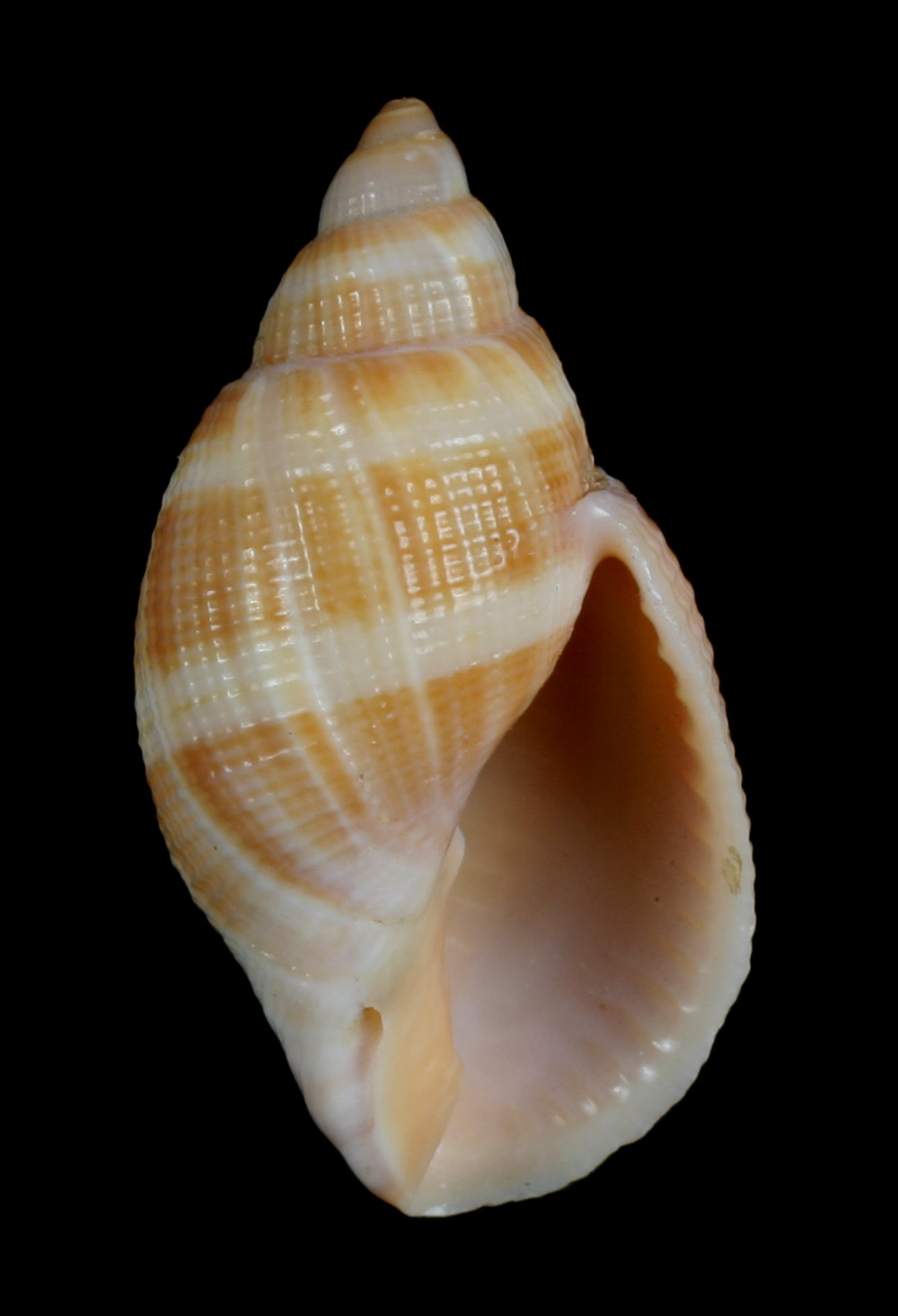
- Apertural view of shell of Merica sinensis (Reeve, 1856)

Scientific classification
- Kingdom: Animalia
- Phylum: Mollusca
- Class: Gastropoda
- Subclass: Caenogastropoda
- Order: Neogastropoda
- Superfamily: Volutoidea
- Family: Cancellariidae
- Genus: Merica; H. Adams & A. Adams, 1854

Type species
- Cancellaria melanostoma G.B. Sowerby II, 1849

Synonyms
- Cancellaria (Merica) H. Adams & A. Adams, 1854 (original rank); Merica (Merica) H. Adams & A. Adams, 1854; Merica (Sydaphera) Iredale, 1929· accepted, alternate representation; Momoebora Kuroda & Habe, 1971

= Merica =

Genus of gastropods

Merica is a genus of sea snails, marine gastropod mollusks in the family Cancellariidae, the nutmeg snails.

== Species ==
Species within the genus Merica include:

- † Merica admirabilis Lozouet, 2019
- Merica aqualica (Petit & Harasewych, 1986)
- Merica asperella (Lamarck, 1822)
- Merica boucheti (Petit & Harasewych, 1986)
- † Merica crenata (Hörnes, 1856)
- Merica deynzeri Petit & Harasewych, 2000
- Merica ektyphos Petit & Harasewych, 2000
- Merica elegans (G.B. Sowerby I, 1822)
- † Merica estotiensis Lozouet, 2019
- Merica gigantea (Lee & Lan, 2002)
- † Merica krocki Kovács & Vicián, 2016
- Merica laticosta (Löbbecke, 1881)
- Merica lussii Petit & Harasewych, 2000
- Merica marisca Bouchet & Petit, 2002
- Merica melanostoma (G.B. Sowerby II, 1849)
- † Merica mutabilis Lozouet, 2019
- Merica oblonga (G.B. Sowerby I, 1825)
- †Merica obsoleta (Hörnes, 1856)
- Merica pilasensis Verhecken, 2018
- Merica purpuriformis (Kiener, 1841)
- Merica semperiana (Crosse, 1863)
- Merica sinensis (Reeve, 1856)
- Merica stuardoi (McLean & Andrade, 1982)
- † Merica succineiformis (Boettger, 1906)
- Merica undulata (G. B. Sowerby II, 1849)
- Merica westralis (Garrard, 1975)

Synonyms:

- Merica (Merica) H. Adams & A. Adams, 1854: alternate representation of Merica H. Adams & A. Adams, 1854
- Merica (Sydaphera) Iredale, 1929: synonym of Sydaphera Iredale, 1929
- †Merica haweraensis Laws, 1940: synonym of † Scalptia haweraensis (Laws, 1940)
- † Merica kaiparaensis Laws, 1939: synonym of † Scalptia kaiparaensis (Laws, 1939) (original combination)
- † Merica mioquadrata Sacco, 1894: synonym of † Perplicaria mioquadrata (Sacco, 1894) (nov. comb.)
- † Merica pukeuriensis Finlay, 1930: synonym of † Scalptia pukeuriensis (Finlay, 1930)
