= Sydaphera panamuna =

Scientific classification
- Kingdom: Animalia
- Phylum: Mollusca
- Class: Gastropoda
- Subclass: Caenogastropoda
- Order: Neogastropoda
- Family: Cancellariidae
- Genus: Sydaphera
- Species: S. panamuna

Binomial name
- Sydaphera panamuna (Garrard, 1975)

Synonyms
- Cancellaria panamuna Garrard, 1975

Species of gastropod

Sydaphera panamuna is a species of sea snail, a marine gastropod mollusk in the family Cancellariidae, the nutmeg snails.

== Description ==
The length of the shell attains 17.2 mm, its diameter 6.9 mm.

== Distribution ==
This species is endemic to Australia and occurs off Northern Territory and Western Australia.
