= Sydaphera delicosa =

Scientific classification
- Kingdom: Animalia
- Phylum: Mollusca
- Class: Gastropoda
- Subclass: Caenogastropoda
- Order: Neogastropoda
- Family: Cancellariidae
- Genus: Sydaphera
- Species: S. delicosa

Binomial name
- Sydaphera delicosa Laseron, 1955

Species of gastropod

Sydaphera delicosa is a species of sea snail, a marine gastropod mollusk in the family Cancellariidae, the nutmeg snails.
