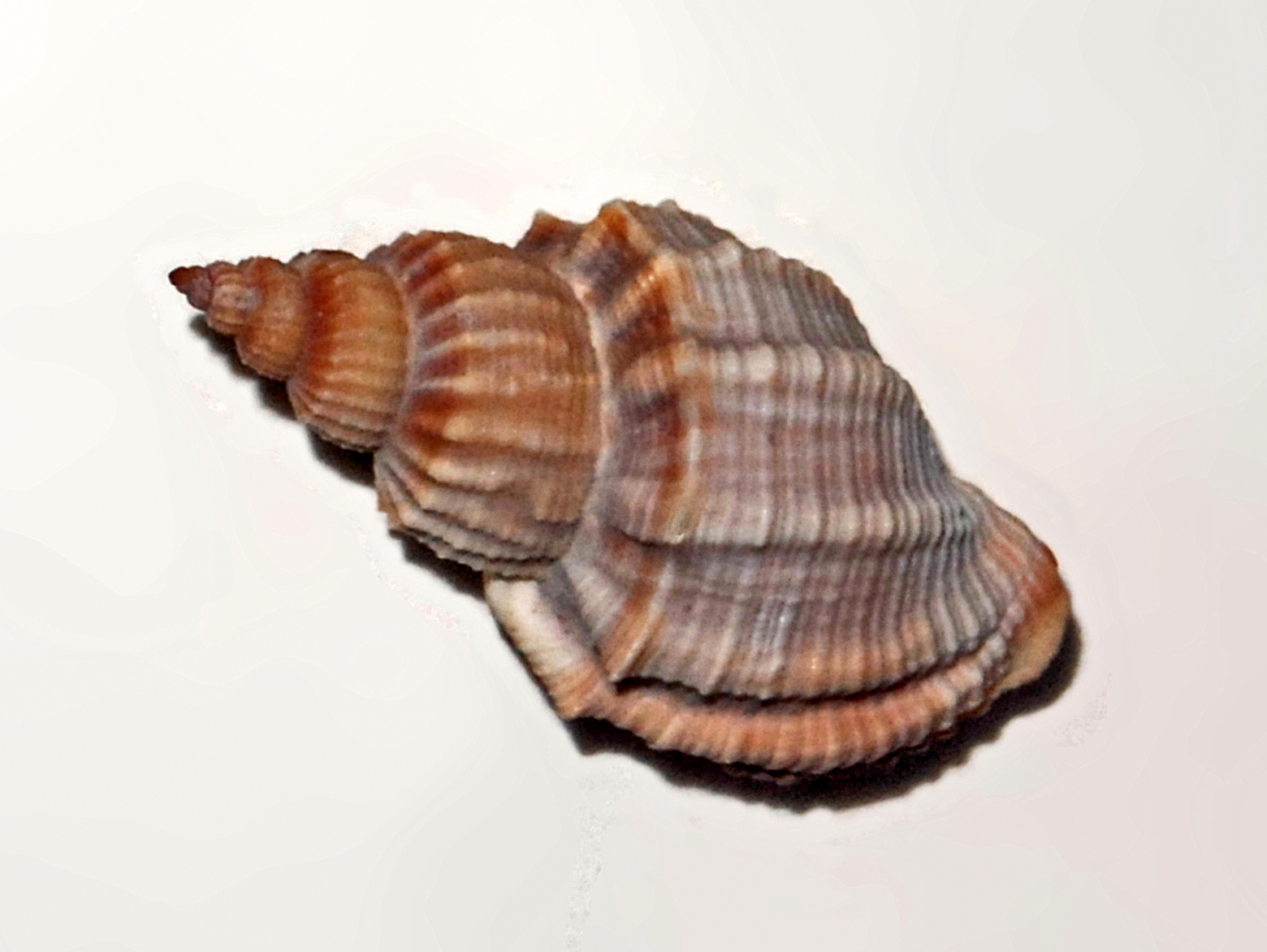
- Sydaphera spengleriana shell

Scientific classification
- Kingdom: Animalia
- Phylum: Mollusca
- Class: Gastropoda
- Subclass: Caenogastropoda
- Order: Neogastropoda
- Family: Cancellariidae
- Genus: Sydaphera
- Species: S. spengleriana

Binomial name
- Sydaphera spengleriana (Deshayes, 1830)

Synonyms
- Cancellaria spengleriana Deshayes, 1830; Cancellaria tritonis Sowerby, 1832

= Sydaphera spengleriana =

Species of gastropod

Sydaphera spengleriana, the Spengler's nutmeg, is a species of sea snail, a marine gastropod mollusk in the family Cancellariidae, the nutmeg snails.

== Distribution ==
This species is widespread from Indonesia to Japan.

== Description ==
Shell of Sydaphera spengleriana can reach a size of 40–70 millimetres (1.6–2.8 in).

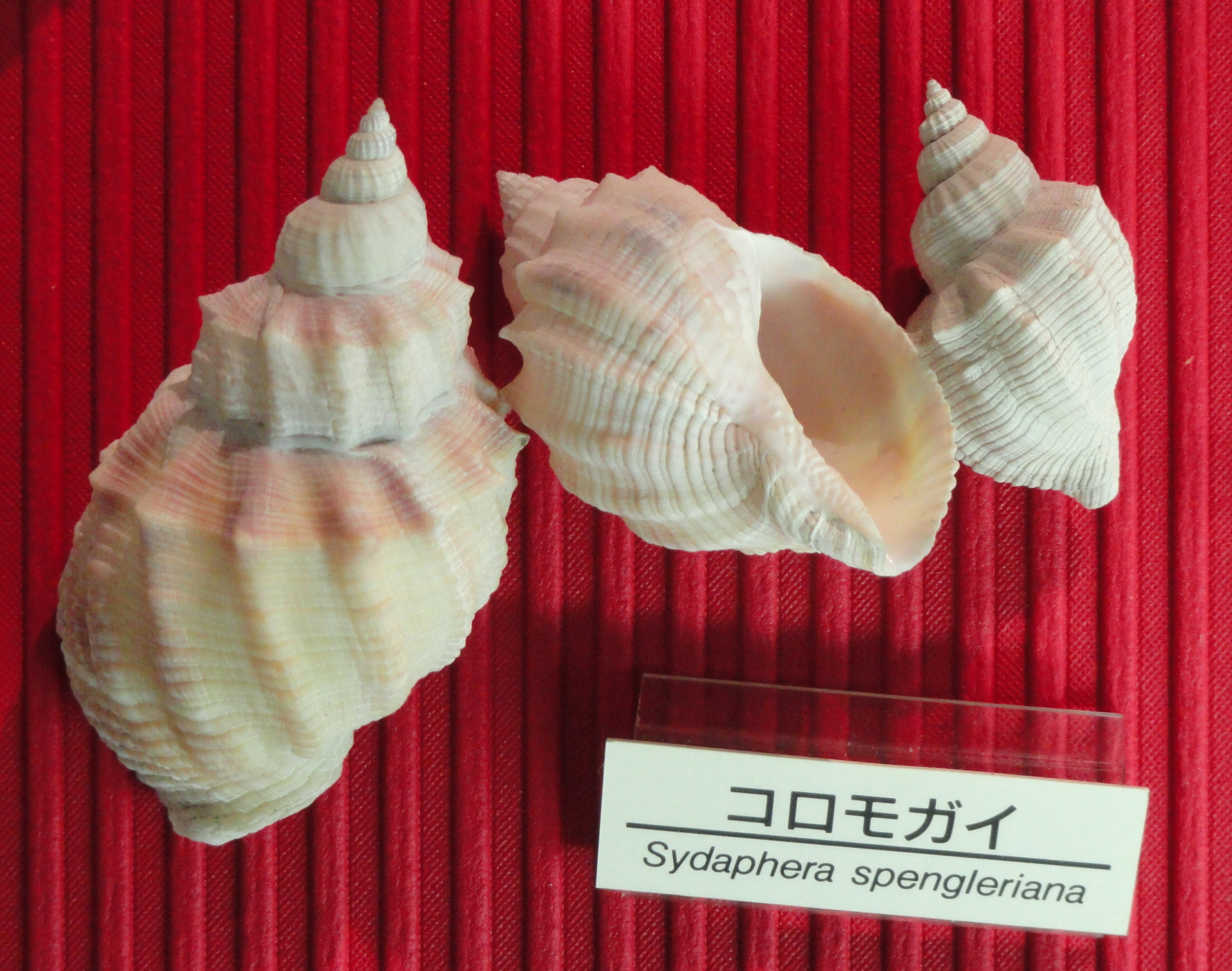
Shells of Sydaphera spengleriana

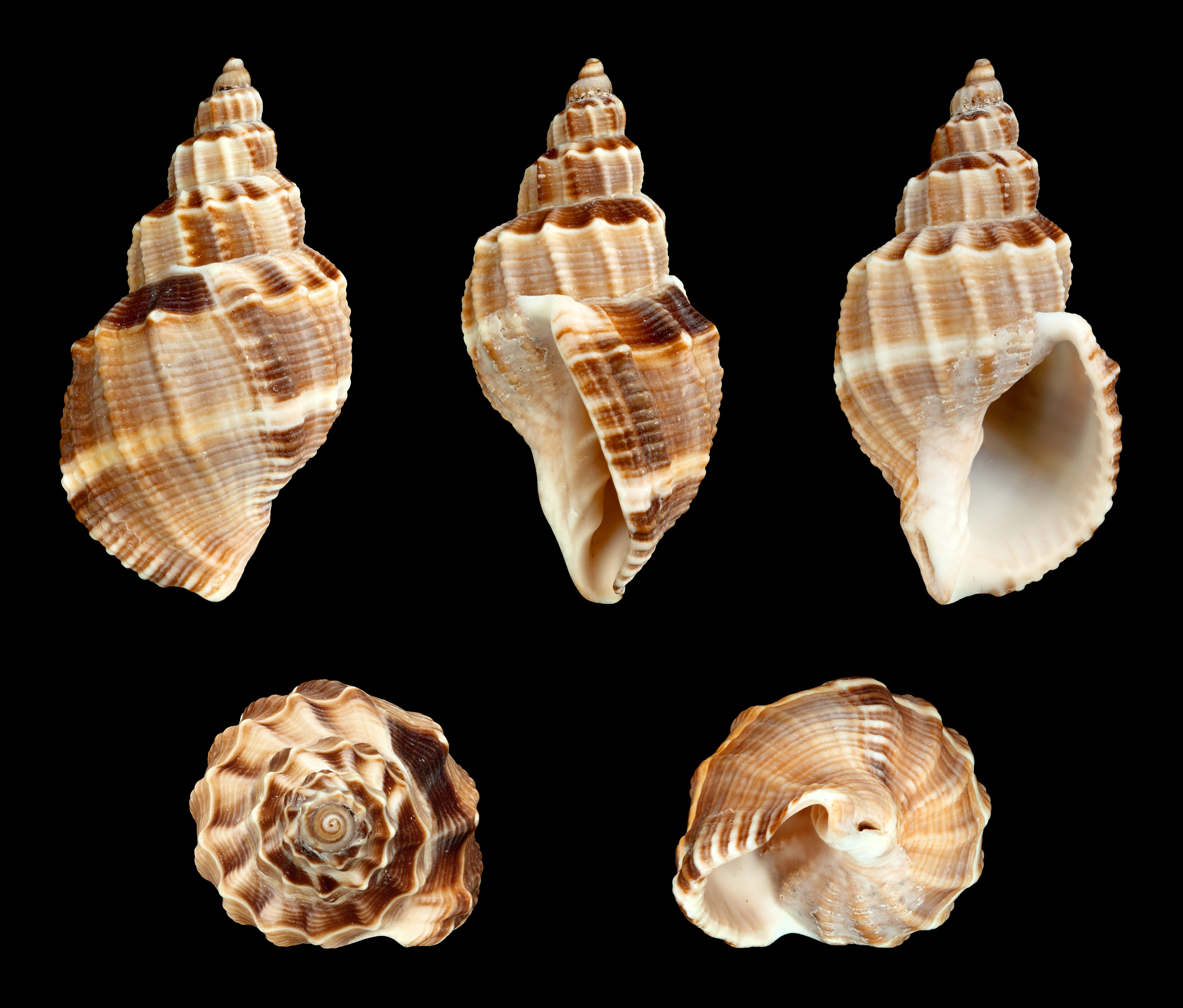
A corrugated form of a shell of Sydaphera spengleriana

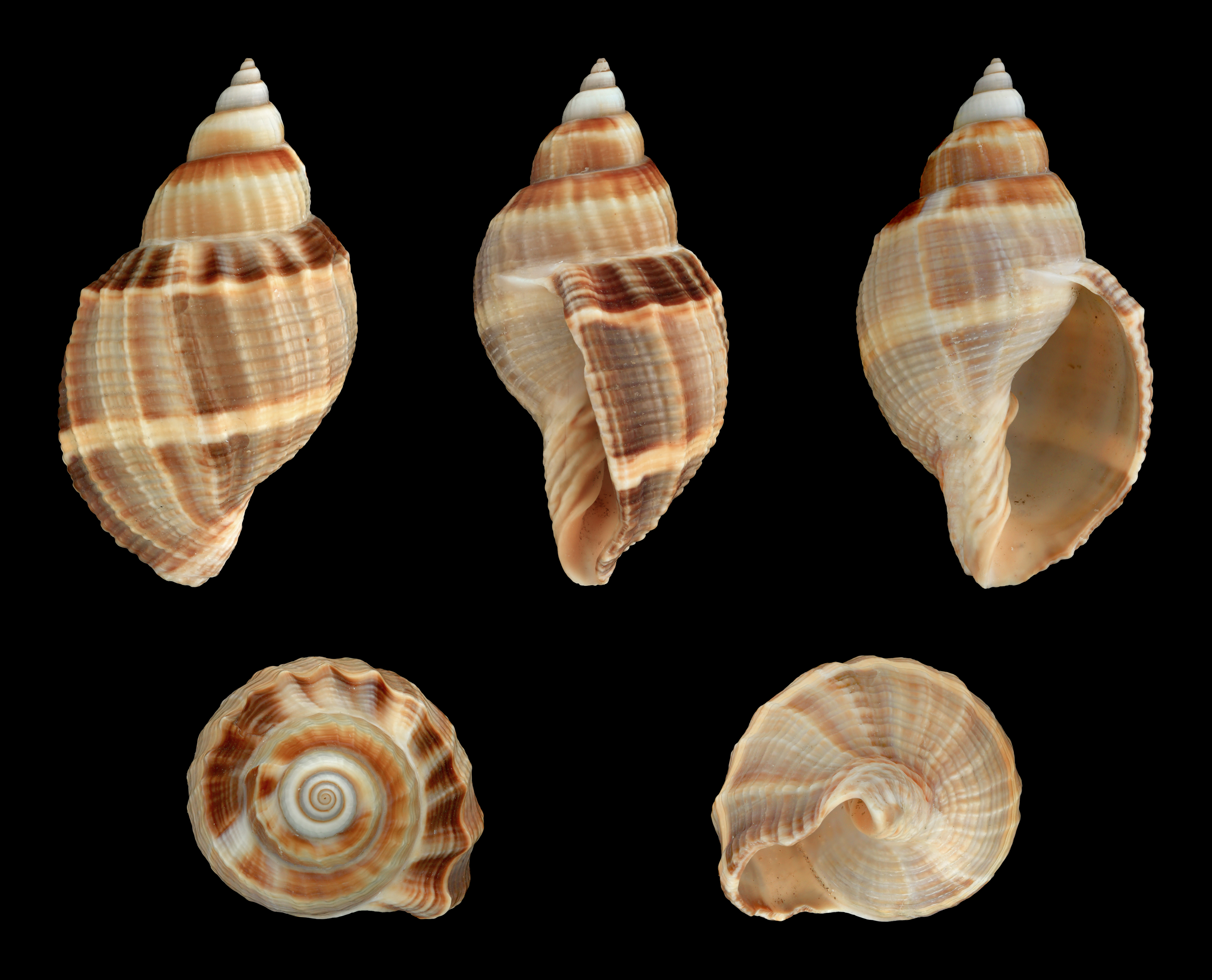
A smooth form

== Bibliography ==
- Jerome M. Eisenberg Jr., William E. Old - Collector's guide to Seashells of the World p 132/19
- R. Tucker Abbott, S. Peter Dance - Compendium of Seashells p 226/1.3
- Alain Robin - Encyclopedia of Marine Gastropods p 457/15
- Encyclopédie Méthodique Vol. 2, p 185
- Hamlyn Guide to Shells of the World p 262
- Hemmen J. (2007) Recent Cancellariidae. Annotated and illustrated catalogue of Recent Cancellariidae. Privately published, Wiesbaden. 428 pp.
- M.B. Pocket Guide to Shells of the World p 133
