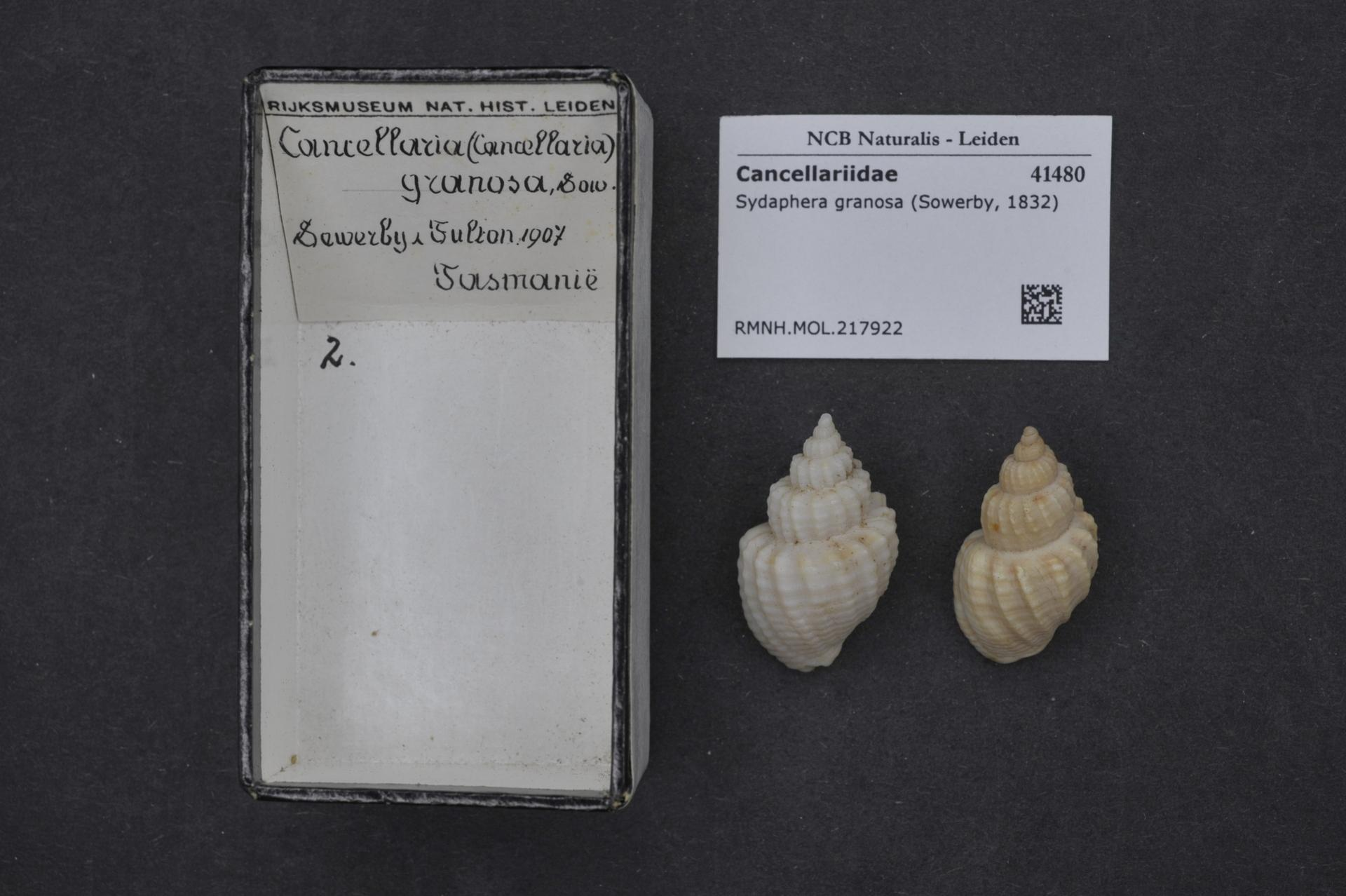

Scientific classification
- Kingdom: Animalia
- Phylum: Mollusca
- Class: Gastropoda
- Subclass: Caenogastropoda
- Order: Neogastropoda
- Family: Cancellariidae
- Genus: Sydaphera
- Species: S. granosa

Binomial name
- Sydaphera granosa (G.B. Sowerby I, 1832b)

Synonyms
- Cancellaria granosa G.B. Sowerby I, 1832b

= Sydaphera granosa =

Species of gastropod

Sydaphera granosa is a species of sea snail, a marine gastropod mollusk in the family Cancellariidae, the nutmeg snails.
