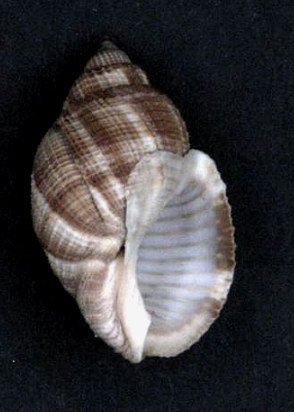
- Apertural view of a shell of Merica asperella (museum specimen at Naturalis Biodiversity Center)

Scientific classification
- Kingdom: Animalia
- Phylum: Mollusca
- Class: Gastropoda
- Subclass: Caenogastropoda
- Order: Neogastropoda
- Family: Cancellariidae
- Genus: Merica
- Species: M. asperella

Binomial name
- Merica asperella (Lamarck, 1822)

Synonyms
- Cancellaria asperella Lamarck, 1822; Cancellaria grayi Tryon, 1885

= Merica asperella =

Species of gastropod

Merica asperella, common name the elegant nutmeg, is a species of sea snail, a marine gastropod mollusk in the family Cancellariidae, the nutmeg snails.

== Description ==
The length of the shell varies between 25 mm and 40 mm.

== Distribution ==
This marine species occurs in the Indo-West Pacific.
