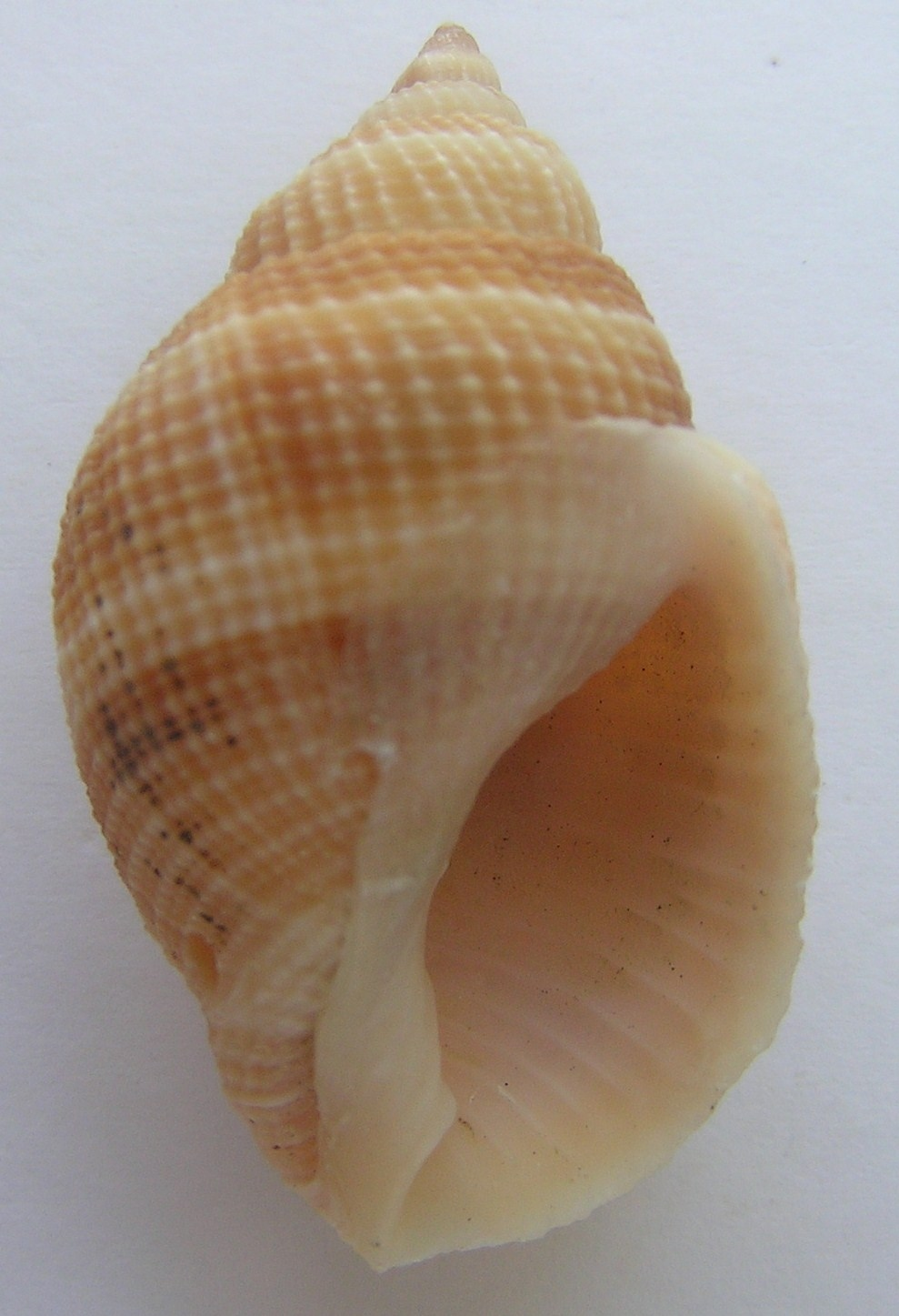
- Apertural view of a shell of Merica melanostoma westralis

Scientific classification
- Kingdom: Animalia
- Phylum: Mollusca
- Class: Gastropoda
- Subclass: Caenogastropoda
- Order: Neogastropoda
- Family: Cancellariidae
- Genus: Merica
- Species: M. melanostoma

Binomial name
- Merica melanostoma (Sowerby, 1849)

Synonyms
- Cancellaria melanostoma Sowerby, 1849

= Merica melanostoma =

Species of gastropod

Merica melanostoma is a species of sea snail, a marine gastropod mollusk in the family Cancellariidae, the nutmeg snails.

== Subspecies ==
- Merica melanostoma melanostoma (Sowerby, G.B. II, 1849)
- Merica melanostoma westralis (Garrard, T.A., 1975)

== Description ==
The shell is whitish-orange and cream. Its size varies between 14mm and 38 mm, ending in a pointed apex. The shells are more globular than the rest of the genus, accented with rounded shoulders and deep sutures. The surface is covered with fine nodules.

== Distribution ==
This species is distributed in the Red Sea, western Indian Ocean, the Gulf of Oman, Western Australia and Northern Australia
