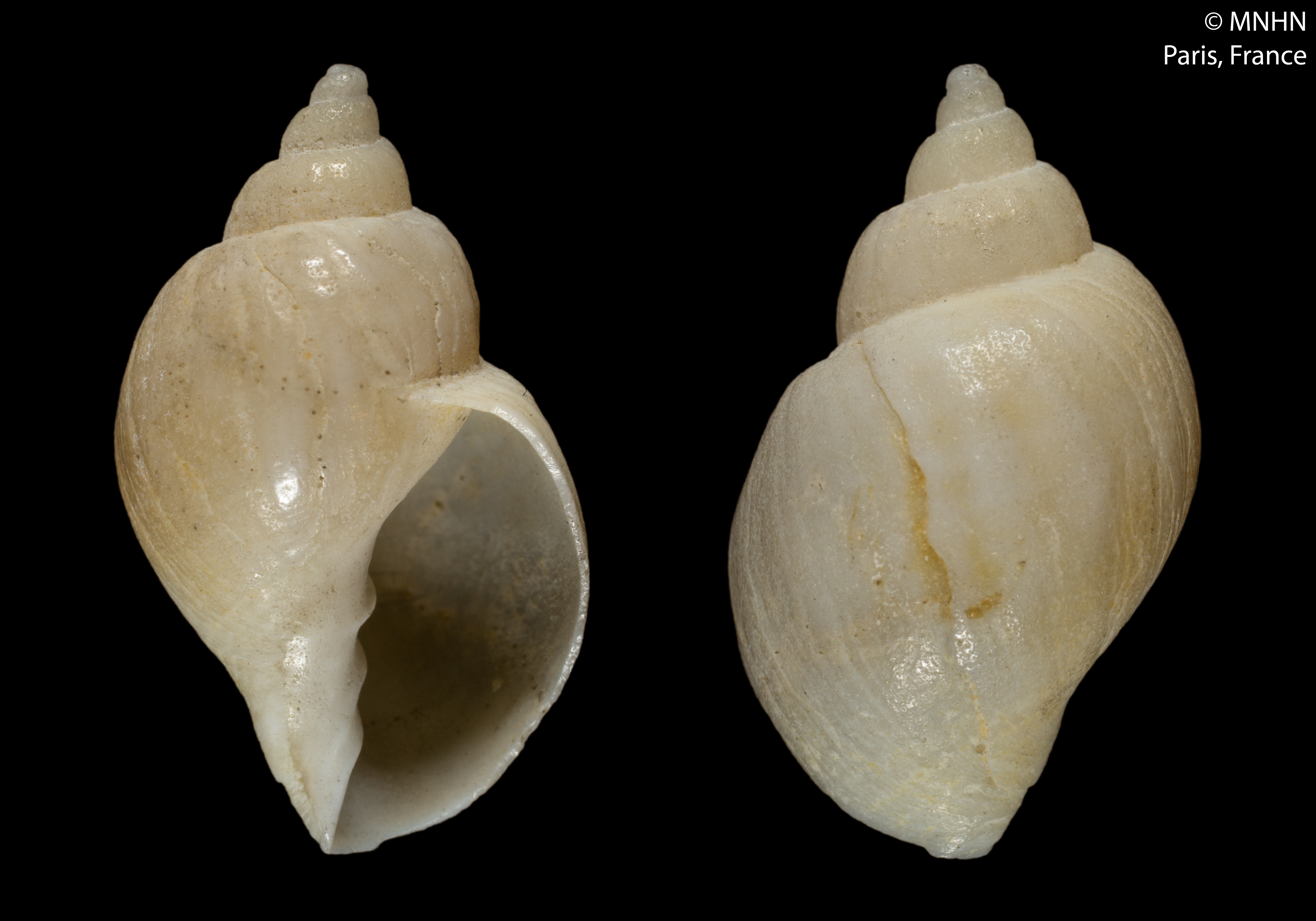
- Shell of Sydaphera lactea (syntype at MNHN, Paris)

Scientific classification
- Kingdom: Animalia
- Phylum: Mollusca
- Class: Gastropoda
- Subclass: Caenogastropoda
- Order: Neogastropoda
- Family: Cancellariidae
- Genus: Sydaphera
- Species: S. lactea

Binomial name
- Sydaphera lactea (Deshayes, 1830)

Synonyms
- Cancellaria lactea Deshayes, 1830; Cancellaria laevigata Sowerby, 1832

= Sydaphera lactea =

Species of gastropod

Sydaphera lactea is a species of sea snail, a marine gastropod mollusk in the family Cancellariidae, the nutmeg snails.
