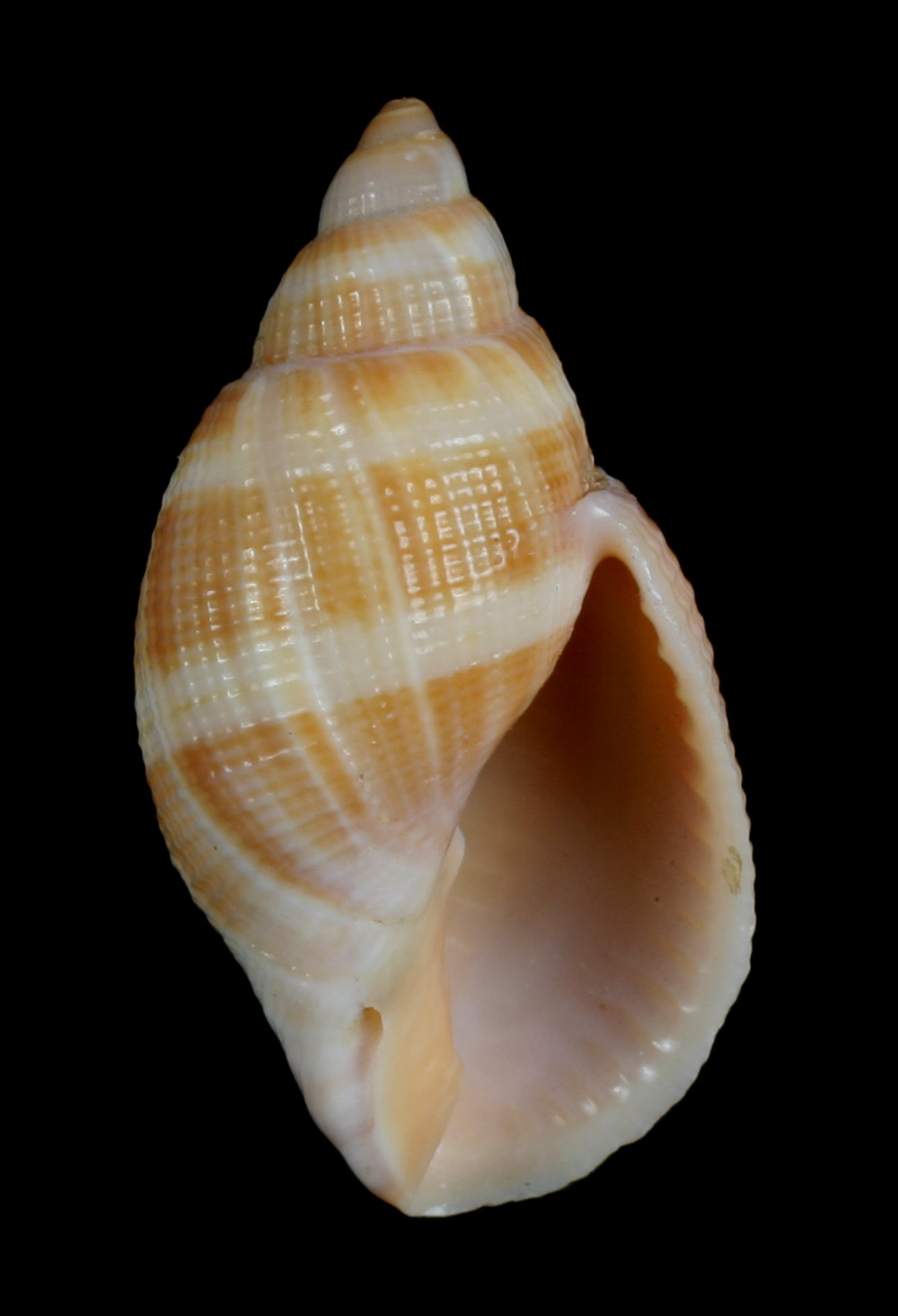
- Apertural view of shell of Merica sinensis (Reeve, 1856)

Scientific classification
- Kingdom: Animalia
- Phylum: Mollusca
- Class: Gastropoda
- Subclass: Caenogastropoda
- Order: Neogastropoda
- Family: Cancellariidae
- Genus: Merica
- Species: M. sinensis

Binomial name
- Merica sinensis (Reeve, 1856)

Synonyms
- Cancellaria sinensis Reeve, 1856

= Merica sinensis =

Species of gastropod

Merica sinensis is a species of sea snail, a marine gastropod mollusk in the family Cancellariidae, the nutmeg snails.
