= Merica lussii =

Scientific classification
- Kingdom: Animalia
- Phylum: Mollusca
- Class: Gastropoda
- Subclass: Caenogastropoda
- Order: Neogastropoda
- Family: Cancellariidae
- Genus: Merica
- Species: M. lussii

Binomial name
- Merica lussii Petit & Harasewych, 2000

Species of gastropod

Merica lussii is a species of sea snail, a marine gastropod mollusk in the family Cancellariidae, the nutmeg snails.
