= Sydaphera fulva =

Scientific classification
- Kingdom: Animalia
- Phylum: Mollusca
- Class: Gastropoda
- Subclass: Caenogastropoda
- Order: Neogastropoda
- Family: Cancellariidae
- Genus: Sydaphera
- Species: S. fulva

Binomial name
- Sydaphera fulva (Lee & Lan, 2002)

Synonyms
- Cancellaria fulva Lee & Lan, 2002

Species of gastropod

Sydaphera fulva is a species of sea snail, a marine gastropod mollusk in the family Cancellariidae, the nutmeg snails.
