= Sydaphera obnixa =

Scientific classification
- Kingdom: Animalia
- Phylum: Mollusca
- Class: Gastropoda
- Subclass: Caenogastropoda
- Order: Neogastropoda
- Family: Cancellariidae
- Genus: Sydaphera
- Species: S. obnixa

Binomial name
- Sydaphera obnixa (Iredale, 1936)

Synonyms
- Sydaphera obnixa Iredale, 1936

Species of gastropod

Sydaphera obnixa is a species of sea snail, a marine gastropod mollusk in the family Cancellariidae, the nutmeg snails.
