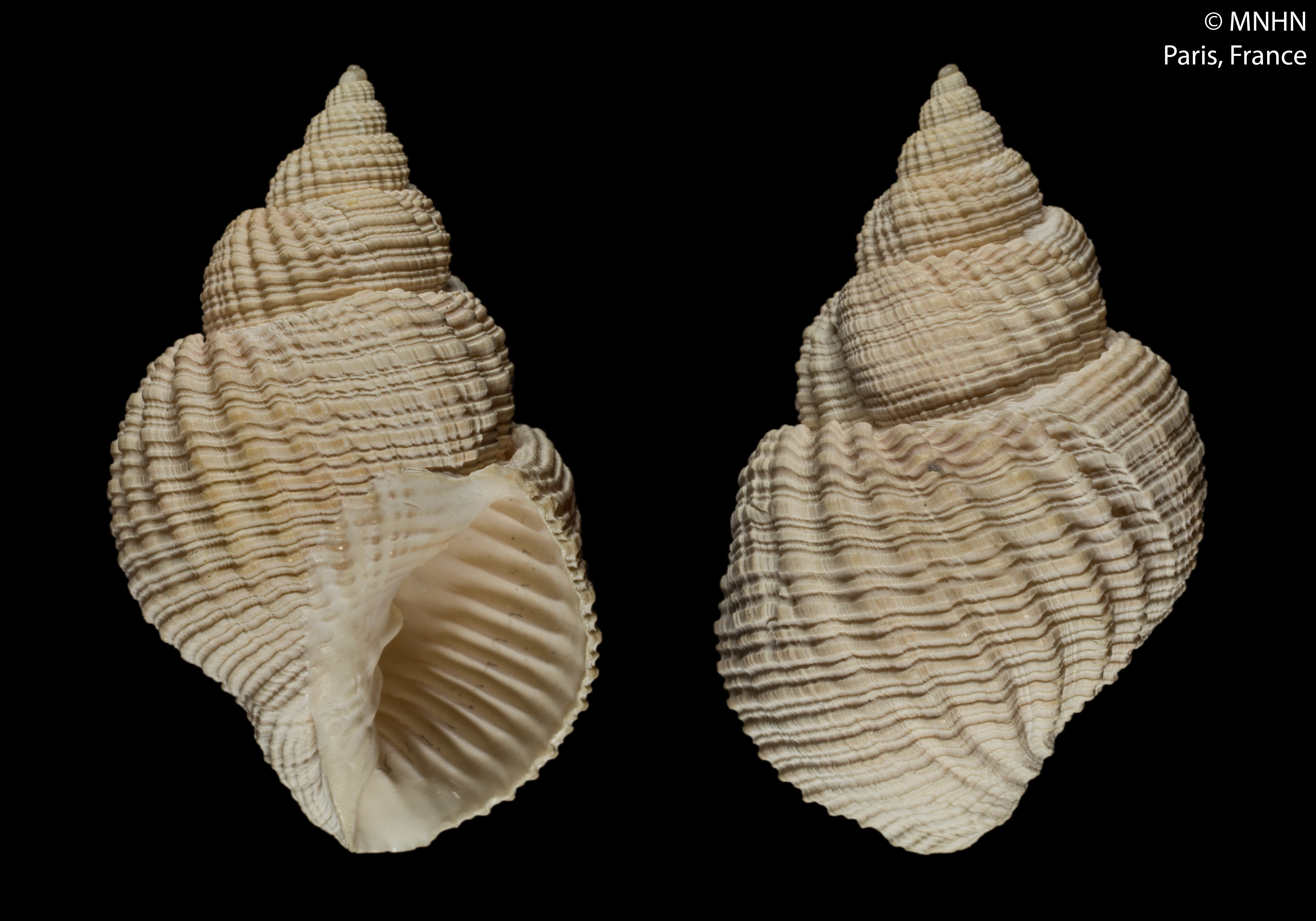

Scientific classification
- Kingdom: Animalia
- Phylum: Mollusca
- Class: Gastropoda
- Subclass: Caenogastropoda
- Order: Neogastropoda
- Family: Cancellariidae
- Genus: Merica
- Species: M. aqualica

Binomial name
- Merica aqualica (Petit & Harasewych, 1986)

Synonyms
- Cancellaria aqualica Petit & Harasewych, 1986 (original combination); Merica (Merica) aqualica (Petit & Harasewych, 1986)

= Merica aqualica =

Species of gastropod

Merica aqualica is a species of sea snail, a marine gastropod mollusk in the family Cancellariidae, the nutmeg snails.

== Description ==
Size is 15–50 mm (0.59–1.97 in).

== Distribution ==
It can be found in the waters around the Philippines.
