= Sydaphera christiana =

Scientific classification
- Kingdom: Animalia
- Phylum: Mollusca
- Class: Gastropoda
- Subclass: Caenogastropoda
- Order: Neogastropoda
- Family: Cancellariidae
- Genus: Sydaphera
- Species: S. christiana

Binomial name
- Sydaphera christiana Verhecken, 2008

Species of gastropod

Sydaphera christiana is a species of sea snail, a marine gastropod mollusk in the family Cancellariidae, the nutmeg snails.
