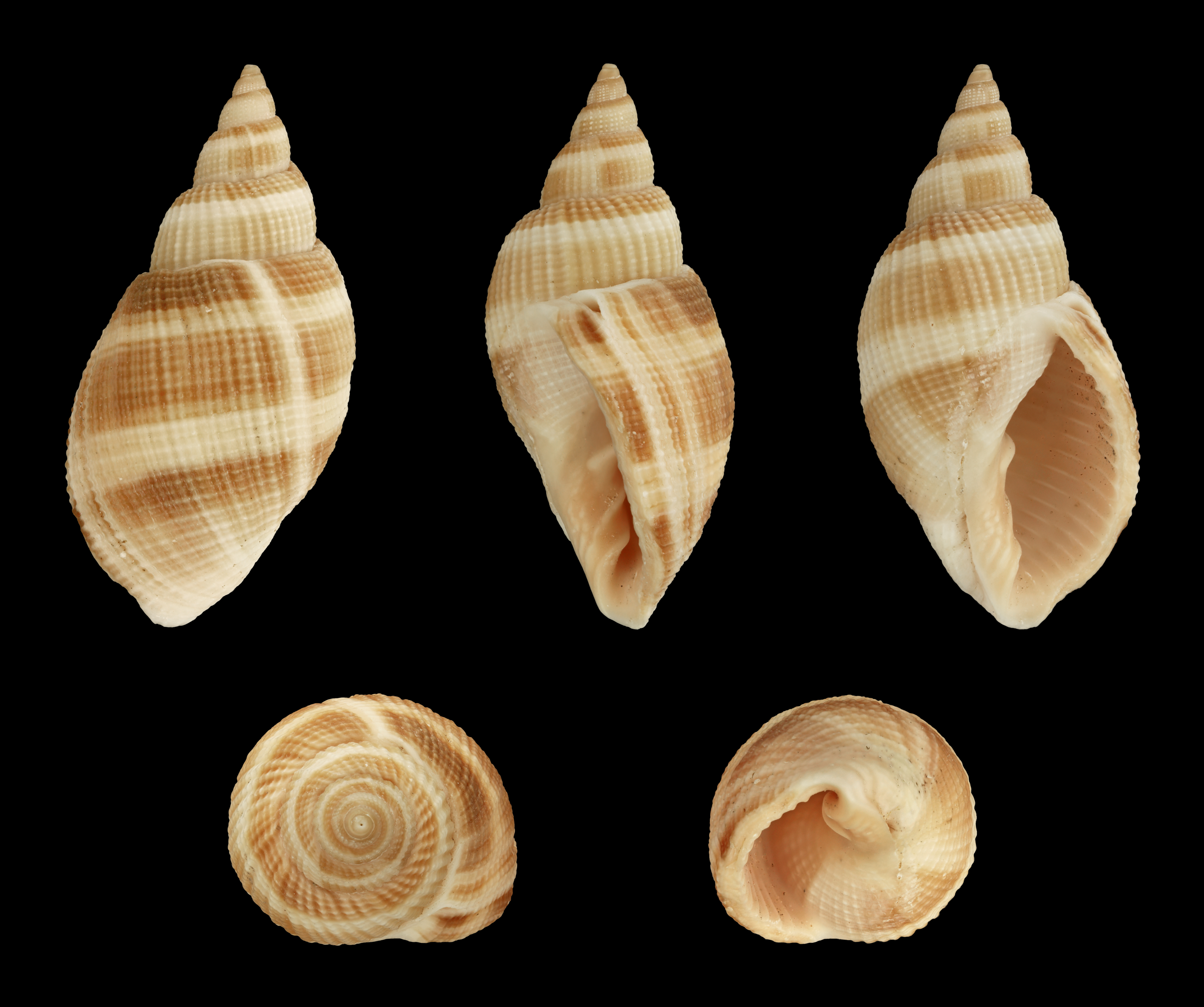
- Shell of Merica oblonga

Scientific classification
- Kingdom: Animalia
- Phylum: Mollusca
- Class: Gastropoda
- Subclass: Caenogastropoda
- Order: Neogastropoda
- Family: Cancellariidae
- Genus: Merica
- Species: M. oblonga

Binomial name
- Merica oblonga (G.B. Sowerby I, 1825)

Synonyms
- Cancellaria bifasciata Deshayes, 1830; Cancellaria decussata Nyst, 1838 (non Sowerby, 1832); Cancellaria oblonga G.B. Sowerby I, 1825

= Merica oblonga =

Species of gastropod

Merica oblonga is a species of sea snail, a marine gastropod mollusc in the family Cancellariidae, the nutmeg snails.
