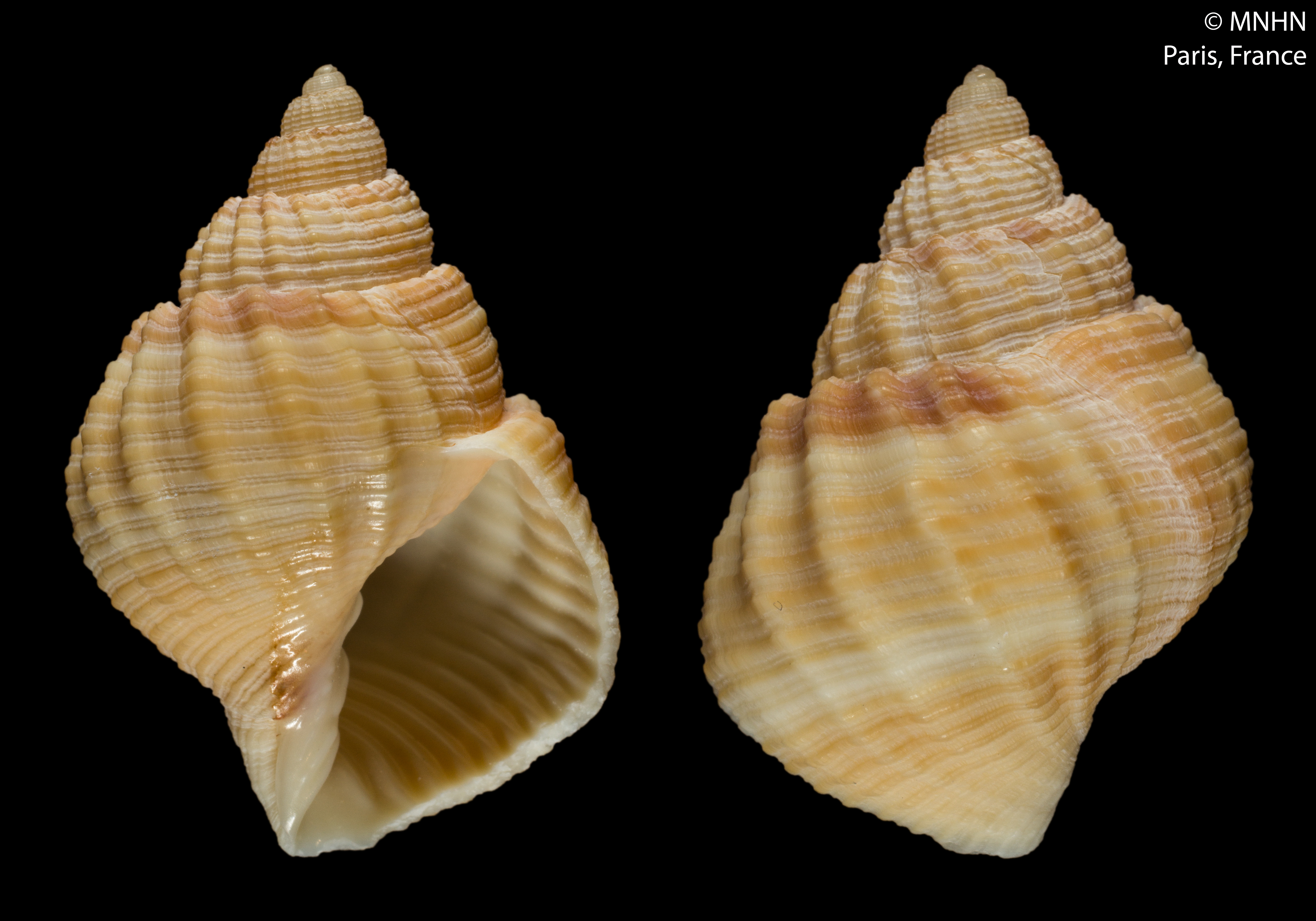

Scientific classification
- Kingdom: Animalia
- Phylum: Mollusca
- Class: Gastropoda
- Subclass: Caenogastropoda
- Order: Neogastropoda
- Family: Cancellariidae
- Genus: Merica
- Species: M. marisca

Binomial name
- Merica marisca Bouchet & Petit, 2002

= Merica marisca =

Species of gastropod

Merica marisca is a species of sea snail, a marine gastropod mollusk in the family Cancellariidae, the nutmeg snails.

== Description ==
The length of the shell attains 25.4 mm.

== Biology ==
This species is a predator.

== Distribution ==
This marine species occurs in benthic zones off New Caledonia.
