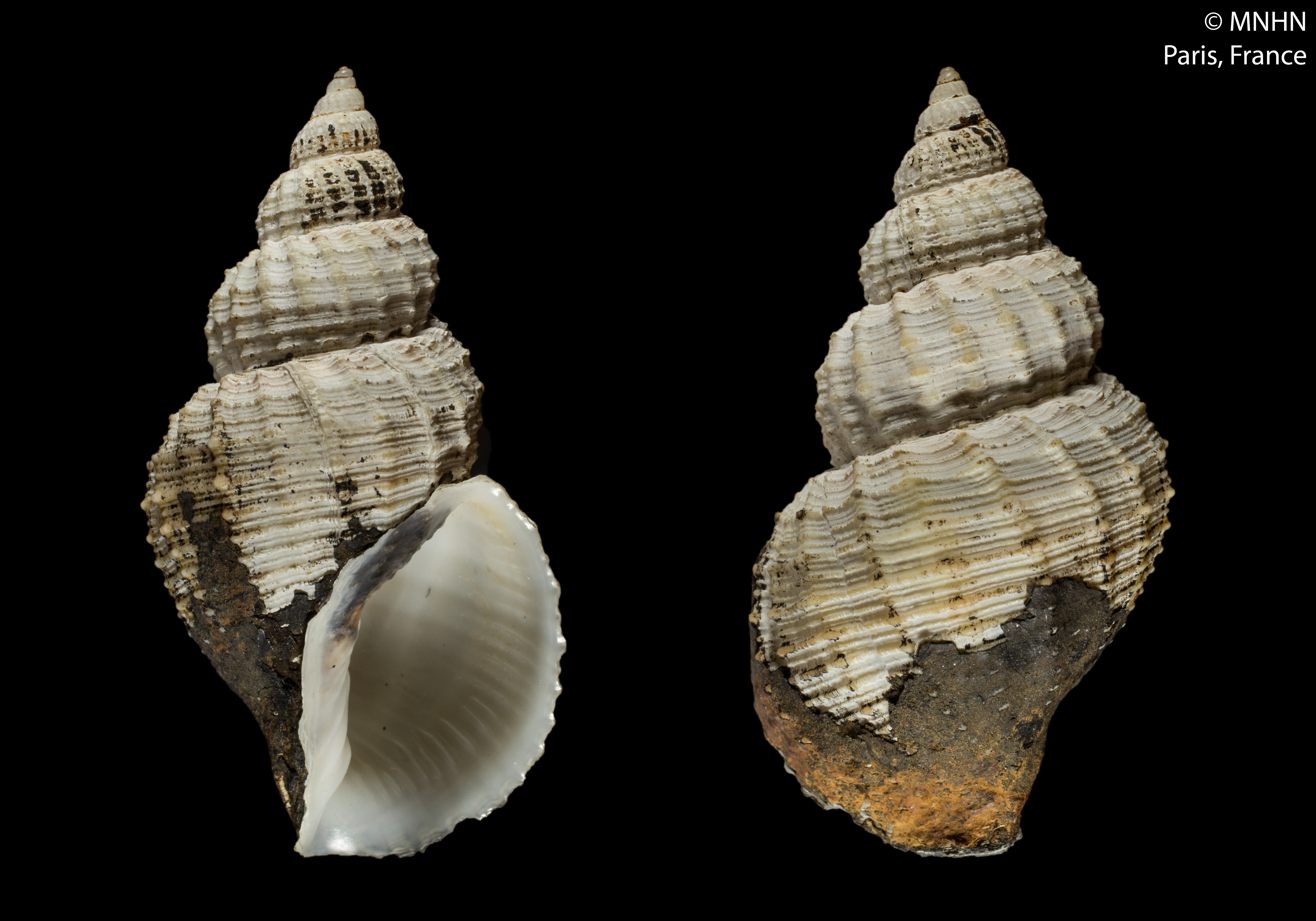

Scientific classification
- Kingdom: Animalia
- Phylum: Mollusca
- Class: Gastropoda
- Subclass: Caenogastropoda
- Order: Neogastropoda
- Family: Cancellariidae
- Genus: Merica
- Species: M. boucheti

Binomial name
- Merica boucheti (Petit & Harasewych, 1986)

Synonyms
- Cancellaria boucheti Petit & Harasewych, 1986 (original combination); Merica (Sydaphera) boucheti (Petit & Harasewych, 1986)

= Merica boucheti =

Species of gastropod

Merica boucheti is a species of sea snail, a marine gastropod mollusk in the family Cancellariidae, the nutmeg snails.

== Distribution ==
This marine species occurs off the Philippines.
