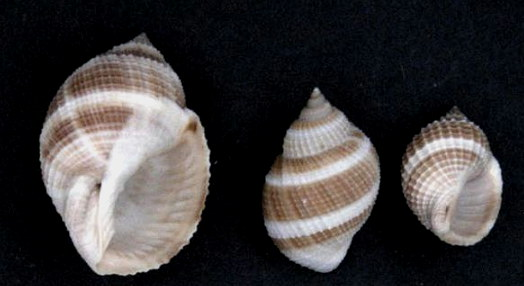
- A collection of shells of Merica elegans (museum specimens at Naturalis Biodiversity Center)

Scientific classification
- Kingdom: Animalia
- Phylum: Mollusca
- Class: Gastropoda
- Subclass: Caenogastropoda
- Order: Neogastropoda
- Family: Cancellariidae
- Genus: Merica
- Species: M. elegans

Binomial name
- Merica elegans (G.B. Sowerby I, 1822)

Synonyms
- Cancellaria elegans G.B. Sowerby I, 1822; Cancellaria reeveana Crosse, 1861; Cancellaria reeveana var. subsinensis Löbbecke, 1881

= Merica elegans =

Species of gastropod

Merica elegans, common name the elegant nutmeg, is a species of sea snail, a marine gastropod mollusk in the family Cancellariidae, the nutmeg snails.

== Description ==
The size of the shell varies between 22 mm and 43 mm.

The protoconch consists of one and a half to two smooth, glossy, slightly deviated whorls, followed by five convex whorls that are rounded at the shoulder and slightly constricted towards the base. The sculpture consists of fine, sharp, oblique ribs — up to 32 on the body whorl and 22 on the penultimate whorl — crossed by fine spiral striae, with four to seven finer threads in the spaces between them. The aperture is elongated and narrowed at both ends, ending in a short, narrow, open siphonal canal. The columella bears three folds, and the outer lip carries 10 to 12 strong ridges running well inside the aperture. The shell is off-white with three broad light to dark brown bands on the body whorl and two on the penultimate whorl, separated by narrow white bands. Australian specimens average 32 mm long and 18 mm wide.

== Distribution ==
This marine species occurs off the Philippines, Indonesia and Western Thailand; also off Australia (Queensland).
