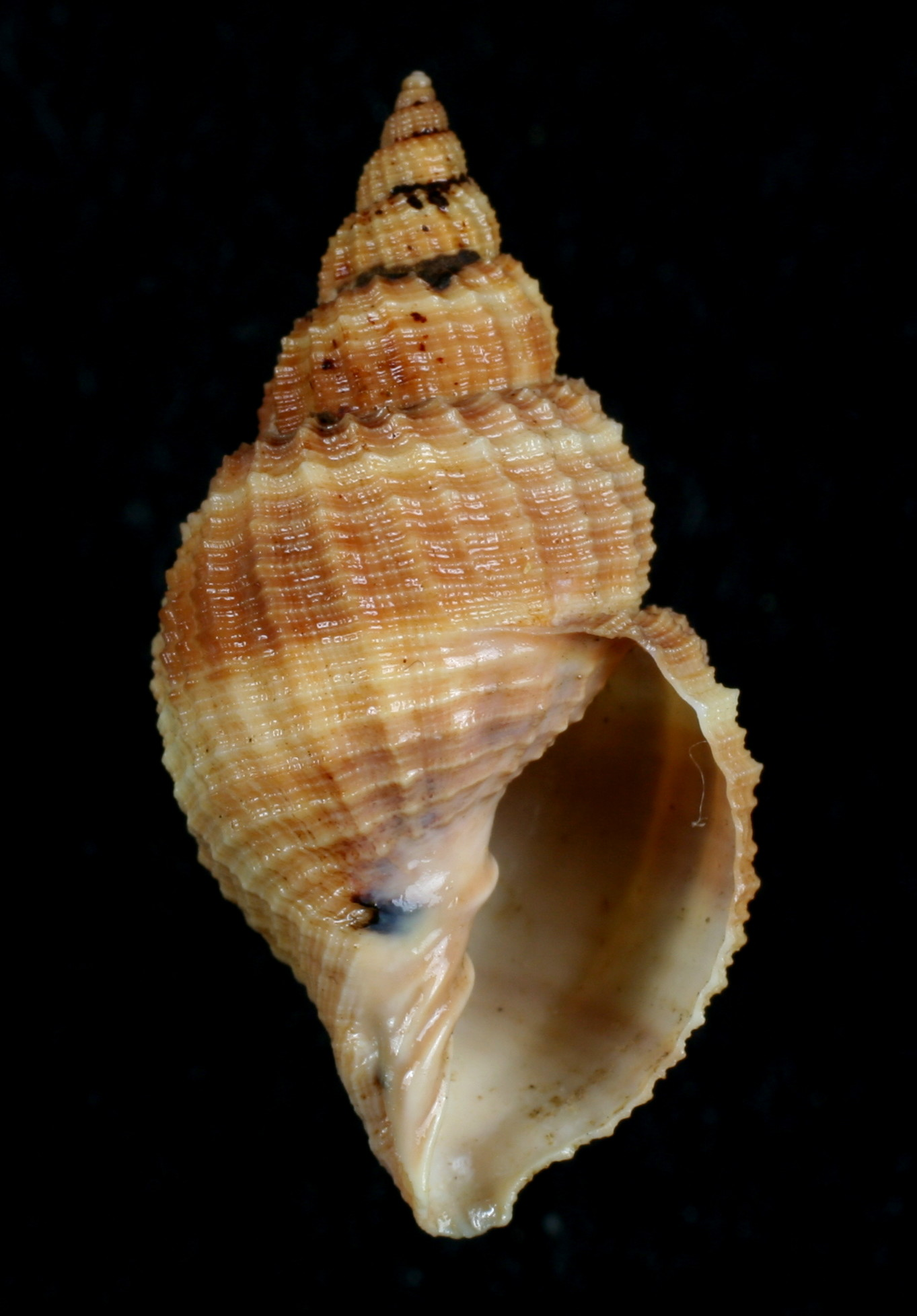
- Apertural view of shell of Merica laticosta (Löbbecke, 1881)

Scientific classification
- Kingdom: Animalia
- Phylum: Mollusca
- Class: Gastropoda
- Subclass: Caenogastropoda
- Order: Neogastropoda
- Family: Cancellariidae
- Genus: Merica
- Species: M. laticosta

Binomial name
- Merica laticosta (Löbbecke, 1881)

Synonyms
- Cancellaria laticosta Löbbecke, 1881

= Merica laticosta =

Species of gastropod

Merica laticosta is a species of sea snail, a marine gastropod mollusk in the family Cancellariidae, the nutmeg snails.
