= Sydaphera anxifer =

Scientific classification
- Kingdom: Animalia
- Phylum: Mollusca
- Class: Gastropoda
- Subclass: Caenogastropoda
- Order: Neogastropoda
- Family: Cancellariidae
- Genus: Sydaphera
- Species: S. anxifer

Binomial name
- Sydaphera anxifer (Iredale, 1925)

Synonyms
- Cancellaria anxifer Iredale, 1925

Species of gastropod

Sydaphera anxifer is a species of sea snail, a marine gastropod mollusk in the family Cancellariidae, the nutmeg snails.
