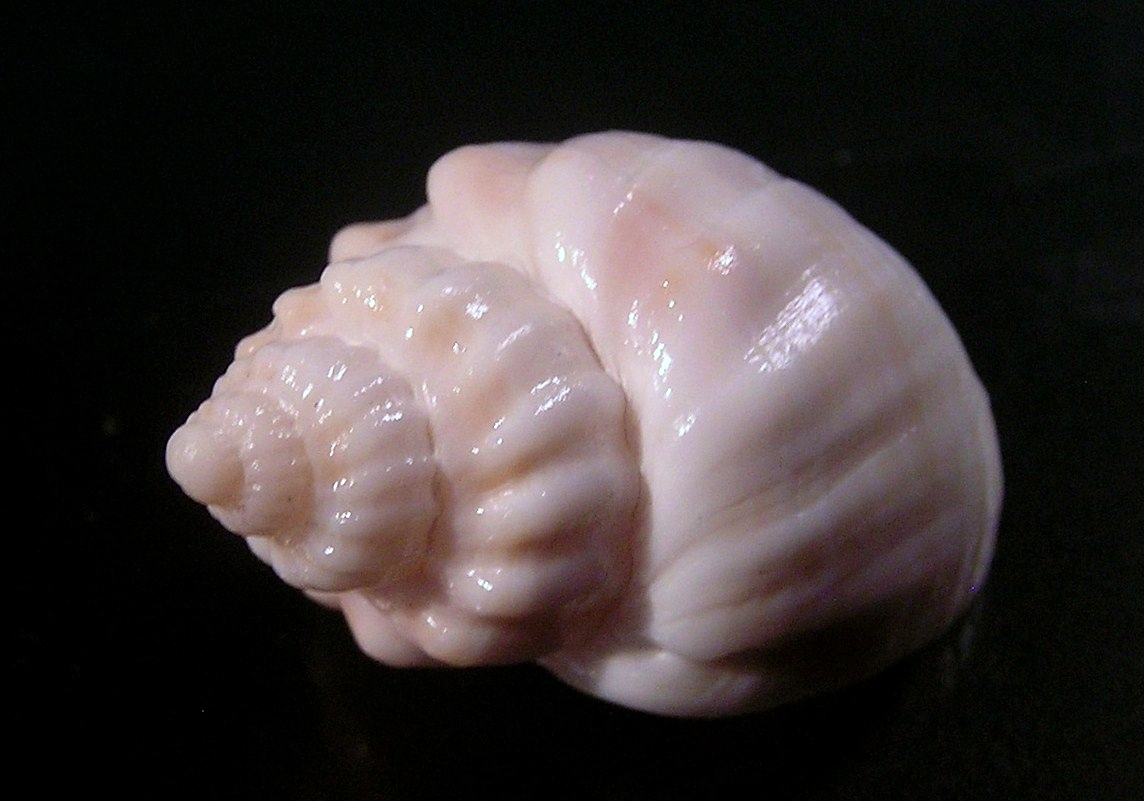
- Shell of Merica undulata

Scientific classification
- Kingdom: Animalia
- Phylum: Mollusca
- Class: Gastropoda
- Subclass: Caenogastropoda
- Order: Neogastropoda
- Family: Cancellariidae
- Genus: Merica
- Species: M. undulata

Binomial name
- Merica undulata (G.B. Sowerby II, 1849)

Synonyms
- Cancellaria undulata G.B. Sowerby II, 1849 (basionym); Cancellaria undulata var. truncata G.B. Sowerby II, 1849a; Merica (Sydaphera) undulata (G. B. Sowerby II, 1849) · alternate representation; Sydaphera renovata Iredale, 1929; Sydaphera undulata (G. B. Sowerby II, 1849)

= Merica undulata =

Species of gastropod

Merica undulata is a species of sea snail, a marine gastropod mollusk in the family Cancellariidae, the nutmeg snails.

== Description ==
The size of an adult shell varies between 22 mm and 42 mm, according to Shells of South East Queensland. The shell is solid, and has whorls with round shoulders. It has multiple grooves and spiral ribs, differing morphologically. It is described to have cream or fawn colour, with bands of dark brown blotches at the shoulders. This is the largest and most common of the Cancellariidae in New South Wales. The majority of specimens are not taken alive.

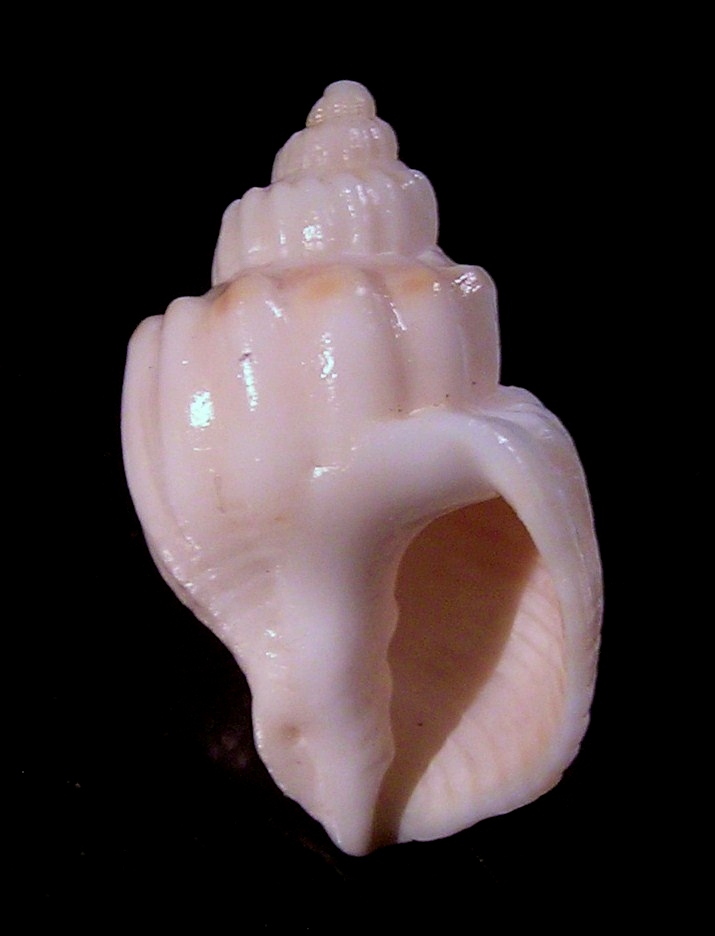
apertural view

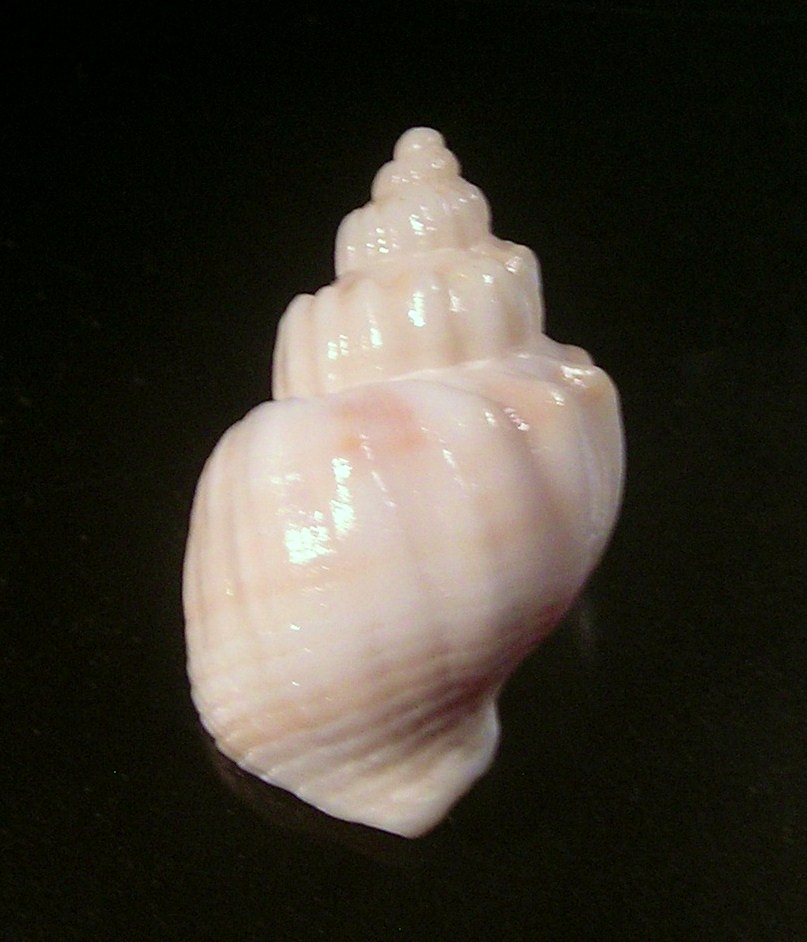
abapertural view

== Distribution ==
This marine species is found between Southern Queensland and Western Australia. They are usually found at a depth of 5 metres.
