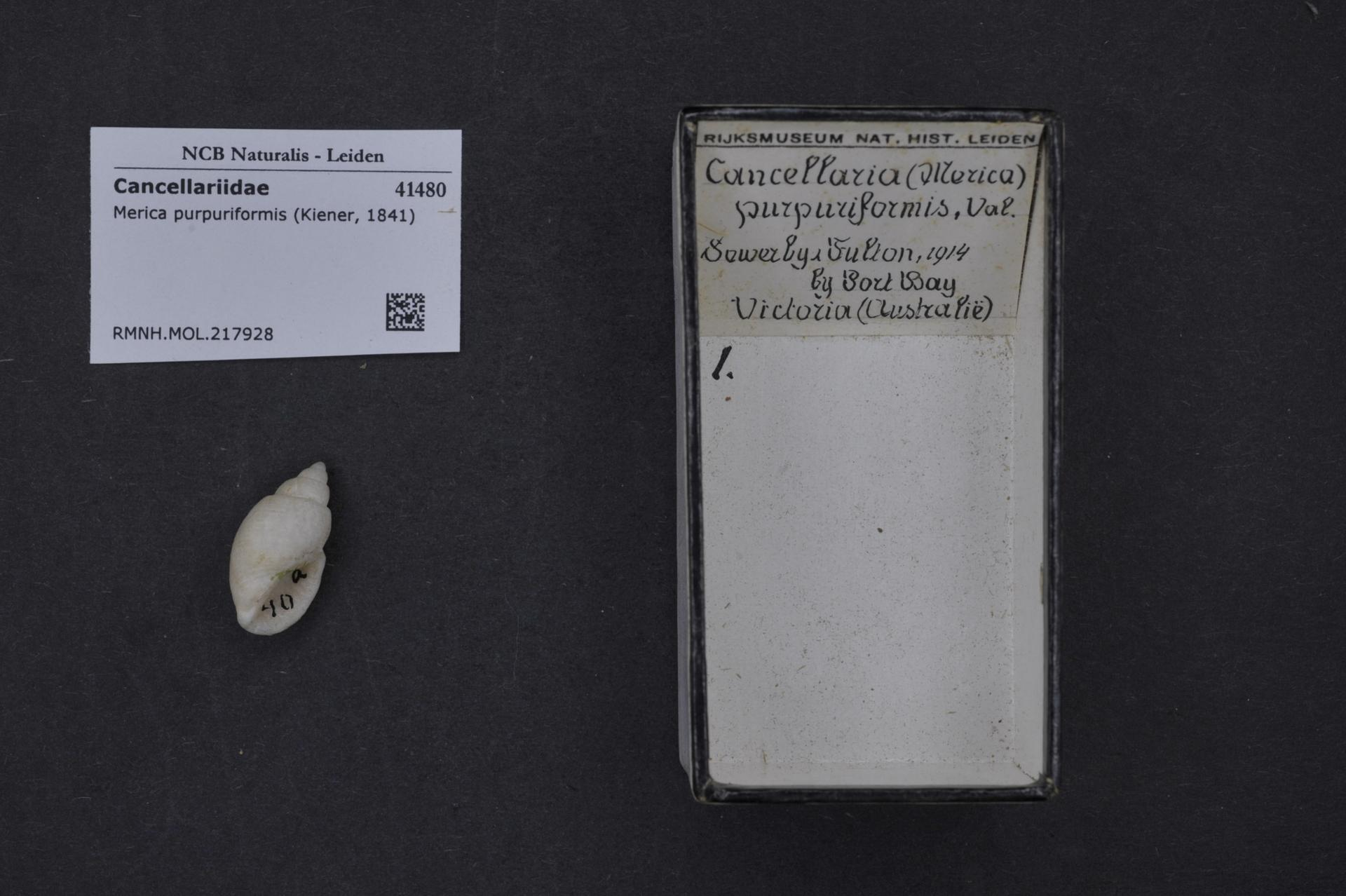
- Shell of Merica purpuriformis (specimen at Naturalis Biodiversity Center)

Scientific classification
- Kingdom: Animalia
- Phylum: Mollusca
- Class: Gastropoda
- Subclass: Caenogastropoda
- Order: Neogastropoda
- Family: Cancellariidae
- Genus: Merica
- Species: M. purpuriformis

Binomial name
- Merica purpuriformis (Kiener, 1841)

Synonyms
- Cancellaria maccoyi Pritchard & Gatlif, 1899; Cancellaria purpuriformis Kiener, 1841; Merica (Merica) purpuriformis (Kiener, 1841) · alternate representation; Sydaphera purpuriformis (Kiener, 1841)

= Merica purpuriformis =

Species of gastropod

Merica purpuriformis is a species of sea snail, a marine gastropod mollusk in the family Cancellariidae, the nutmeg snails.
