= Merica gigantea =

Scientific classification
- Kingdom: Animalia
- Phylum: Mollusca
- Class: Gastropoda
- Subclass: Caenogastropoda
- Order: Neogastropoda
- Family: Cancellariidae
- Genus: Merica
- Species: M. gigantea

Binomial name
- Merica gigantea (Lee & Lan, 2002)

Synonyms
- Cancellaria gigantea Lee & Lan, 2002; Merica (Sydaphera) gigantea (Y.-C. Lee & T. C. Lan, 2002) · alternate representation; Sydaphera gigantea (Y.-C. Lee & T. C. Lan, 2002)

Species of gastropod

Merica gigantea is a species of sea snail, a marine gastropod mollusk in the family Cancellariidae, the nutmeg snails.
