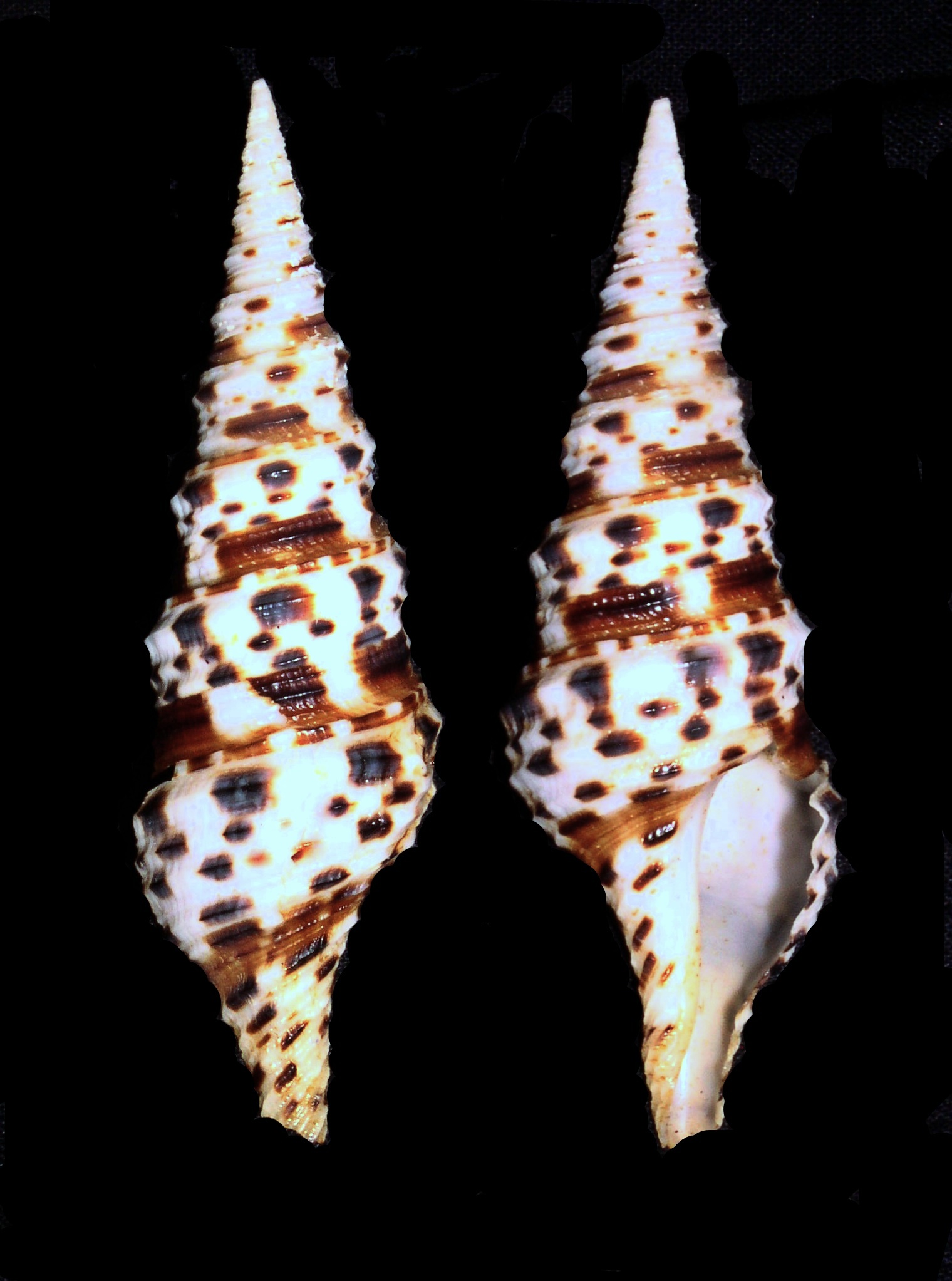
- a shell of Turris babylonia

Scientific classification
- Kingdom: Animalia
- Phylum: Mollusca
- Class: Gastropoda
- Subclass: Caenogastropoda
- Order: Neogastropoda
- Family: Turridae
- Genus: Turris; Batsch, 1789

Type species
- Murex babylonius Linnaeus, 1758

Synonyms
- Annulaturris Powell, 1966; Mitra (Turris) Batsch, 1789; Pleurotoma Lamarck, 1799; Pleurotoma (Turris) Batsch, 1789; Turris (Annulaturris) Powell, 1966 · alternate representation

= Turris =

Genus of mollusks

Turris is a genus of sea snails, marine gastropod mollusks in the family Turridae, the turrids.

== Description ==
The generally large shells are variegated with spots. The fusiform shell is turriculated with a long, sharp spire. The aperture is ovate. The columellar lip is smooth. The outer lip is separated with a narrow profound sinus from the suture rather than distantly. The siphonal canal is long and narrow, straight and open.

(Description by Charles Hedley) The shell is large, with a tall slender spire. The outer lip is sharp, without fold or thickening. The siphonal notch is a deep slit with parallel sides following a walled-in fasciole. Within the body whorl are sharp raised revolving threads, a feature shared by related genera. The protoconch consists of two smooth rounded whorls. The operculum is unguiculate, with an apical nucleus.

The foot of the animal is anteriorly truncated but obtuse posteriorly. The tentacles are cylindrical, with the eyes externally near their base The teeth of the toxoglossan radula are falciform and angulated (formula 1-0-1).

== Distribution ==
This genus inhabits warm seas.

== Species ==
The extinct species are only tentatively placed in the genus Turris.

- † Turris adendanii Abbass, 1967
- † Turris aenigmaticus Dartevelle (E.) & Brébion (P.), 1956
- † Turris aequensis (J.P.S. Grateloup, 1832 )
- † Turris ahmedi Abbass, 1967
- † Turris altispira (W.L. May, 1922 )
- Turris ambages Barnard, 1958
- Turris amicta (Smith, E.A., 1877)
- † Turris andersoni Dickerson 1913
- Turris annulata (Reeve, 1843)
- Turris babylonia (Linne, 1758)
- †Turris baudoni (G.P. Deshayes, 1866)
- Turris bipartita Kilburn, Fedosov & Olivera, 2012
- Turris brevicanalis (Kuroda, Habe & Oyama, 1971)
- † Turris burroensis Nelson 1925
- † Turris canaliculata É.A. Benoist, 1873
- † Turris carlsoni Anderson and Martin 1914
- Turris chaldaea Kilburn, Fedosov & Olivera, 2012
- † Turris clallamensis Weaver 1916
- Turris clausifossata Kilburn, Fedosov & Olivera, 2012
- † Turris cleopatrae Abbass 1967
- Turris condei Vera-Pelaez et al., 2000
- Turris crispa (Lamarck, 1816)
- † Turris dickersoni C.E. Weaver, 1916
- † Turris elsmerensis English 1914
- Turris faleiroi Kilburn, 1998
- †Turris farouqui Abbass H., 1977
- † Turris fernandoensis English 1914
- Turris garnonsii (Reeve, 1843)
- † Turris garoensis Mukerjee 1939
- † Turris gilchristi Dey 1961
- Turris grandis (Gray, 1834)
- Turris guidopoppei Kilburn, Fedosov & Olivera, 2012
- Turris hidalgoi Vera-Pelaez et al., 2000
- † Turris higoensis Nagao 1928
- † Turris hornesi Deshayes 1866
- † Turris inconstans Cooper 1894
- Turris intercancellata Kilburn, Fedosov & Olivera, 2012
- Turris intricata Powell, 1964
- † Turris kaffraria Woods 1906
- Turris kantori Kilburn, Fedosov & Olivera, 2012
- Turris kathiewayae Kilburn, Fedosov & Olivera, 2012
- † Turris kirkensis Clark 1915
- † Turris lincolnensis Anderson and Martin 1914
- † Turris louderbacki Dickerson 1914
- † Turris monilifera (Cooper 1894)
- † Turris multigyrata Cossmann 1906
- Turris normandavidsoni Olivera, 1999
- † Turris packardi Weaver, 1916
- Turris pagasa Olivera, 1999
- † Turris perarata (TateE in Cossmann, 1896)
- † Turris perkinsiana Cooper 1894
- † Turris plicata Waring 1917
- Turris proesignis (E.A. Smith, 1895)
- † Turris pulchra Dickerson 1915
- Turris ruthae Kilburn, 1983
- † Turris selwyni (Pritchard, 1904)
- † Turris semipustulosa Lozouet, 2017
- † Turris septemlirata (G.F. Harris, 1897 )
- Turris spectabilis (Reeve, 1843)
- † Turris suturalis Cooper 1894
- † Turris thurstonensis (Weaver, 1916)
- † Turris trilirata (G.F. Harris, 1897)
- Turris venusta (Reeve, 1843)
- Turris yeddoensis (Jousseaume, 1883)
- † Turris vermicularis (Grateloup, 1832)
- † Turris worcesteri Winkle 1918
- † Turris wynoocheensis Weaver, 1916

=== Fossil Turris-species ===
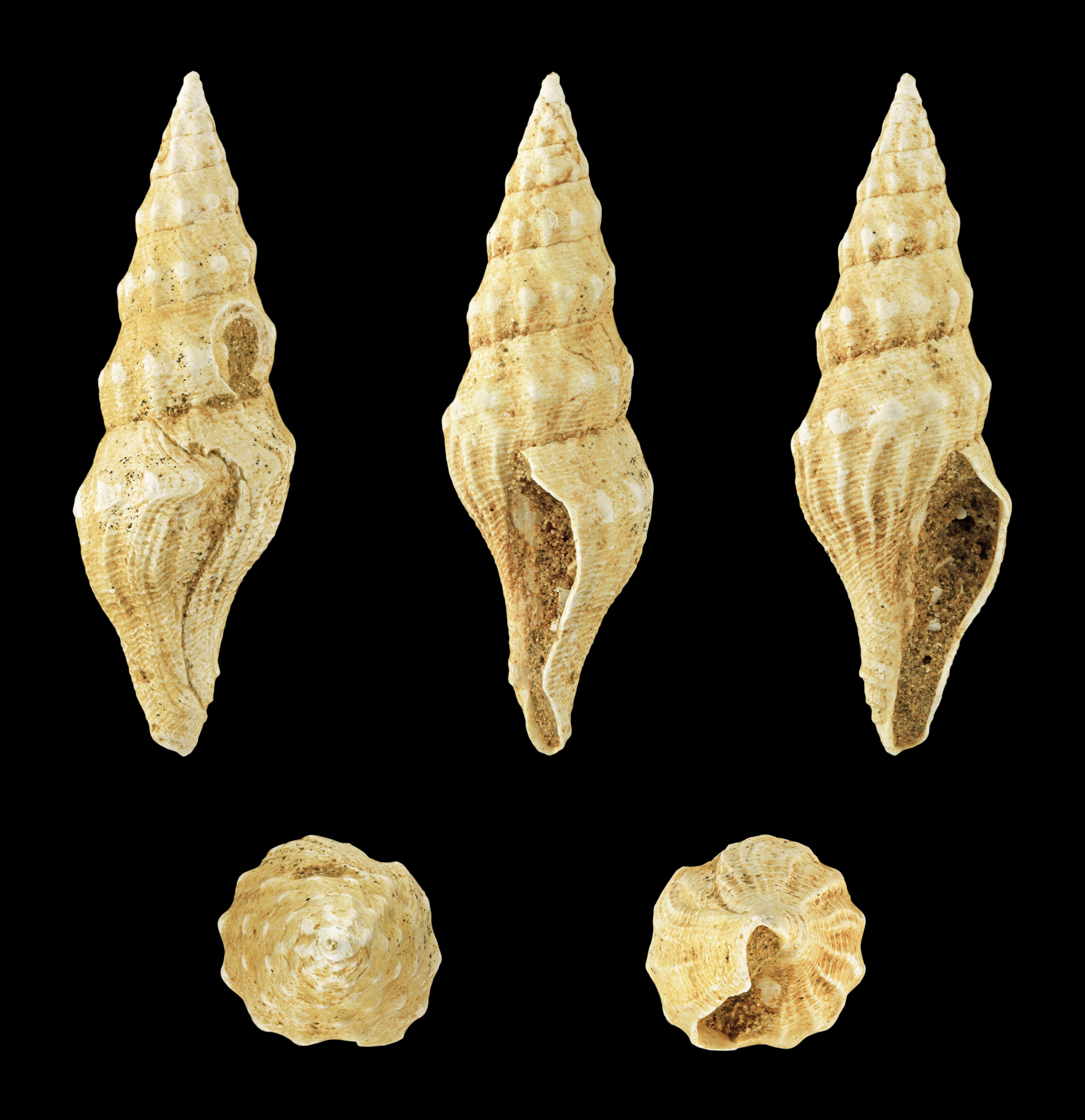
Turris aequensis

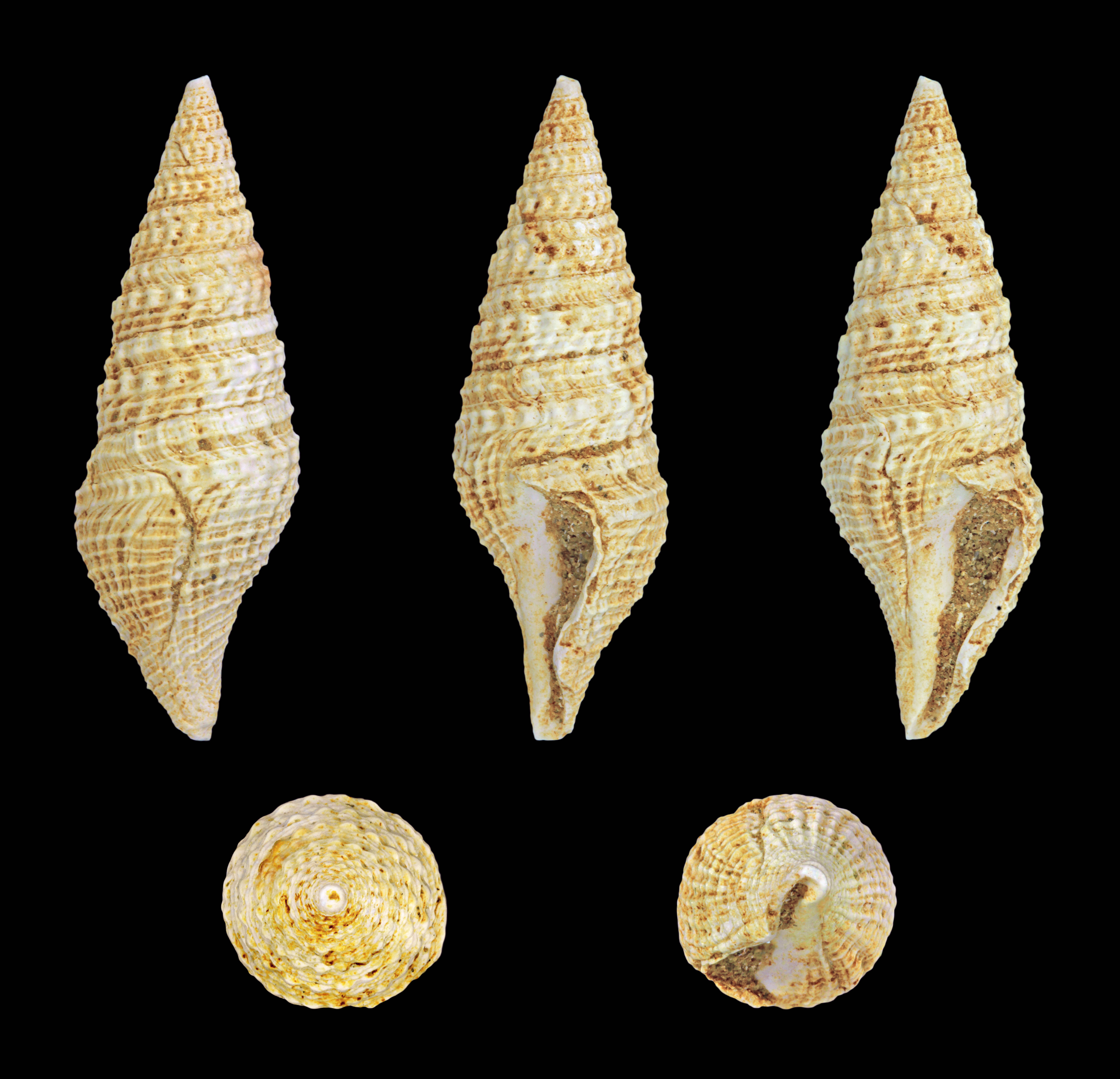
Turris canaliculata

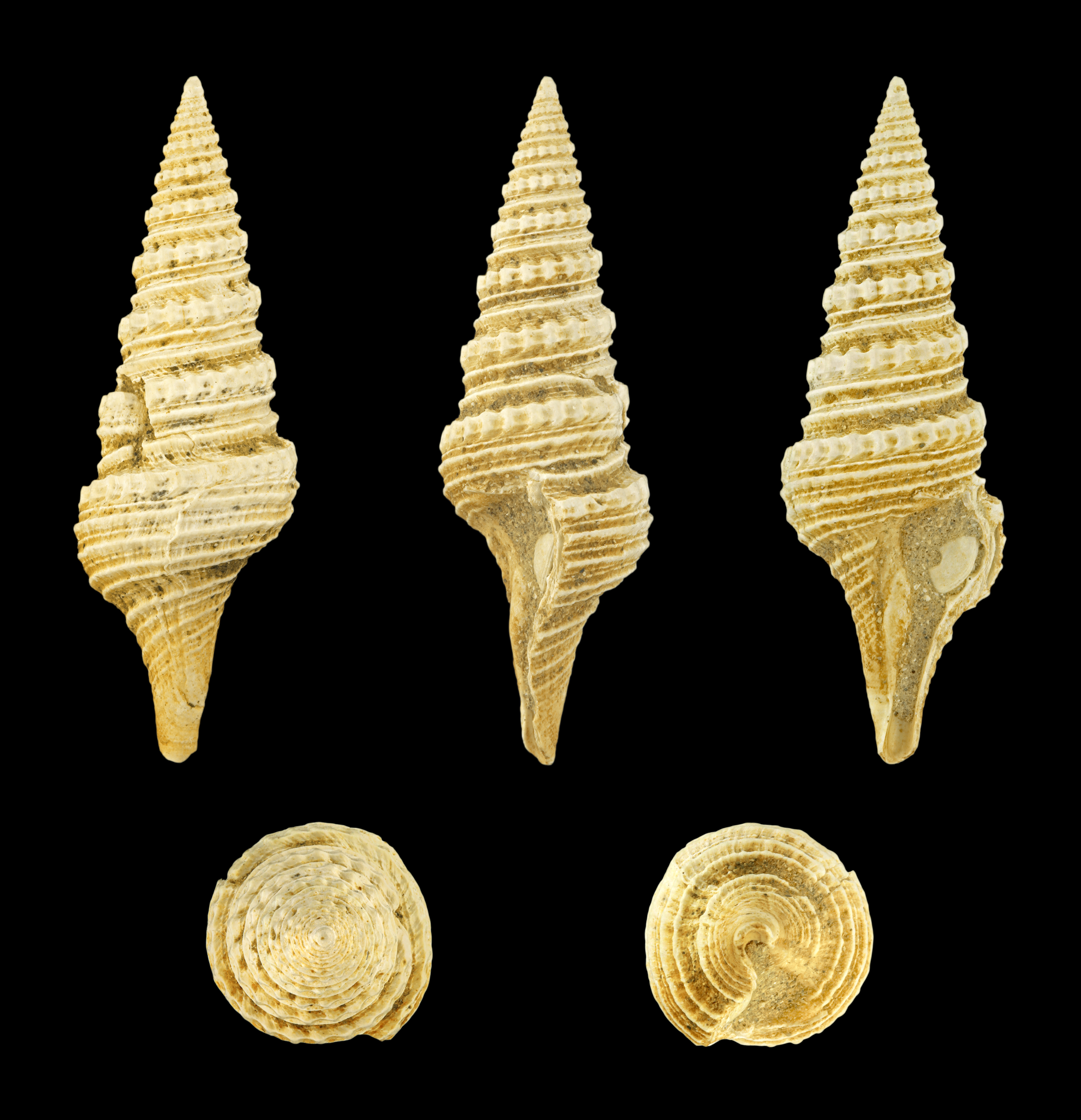
Turris denticulata

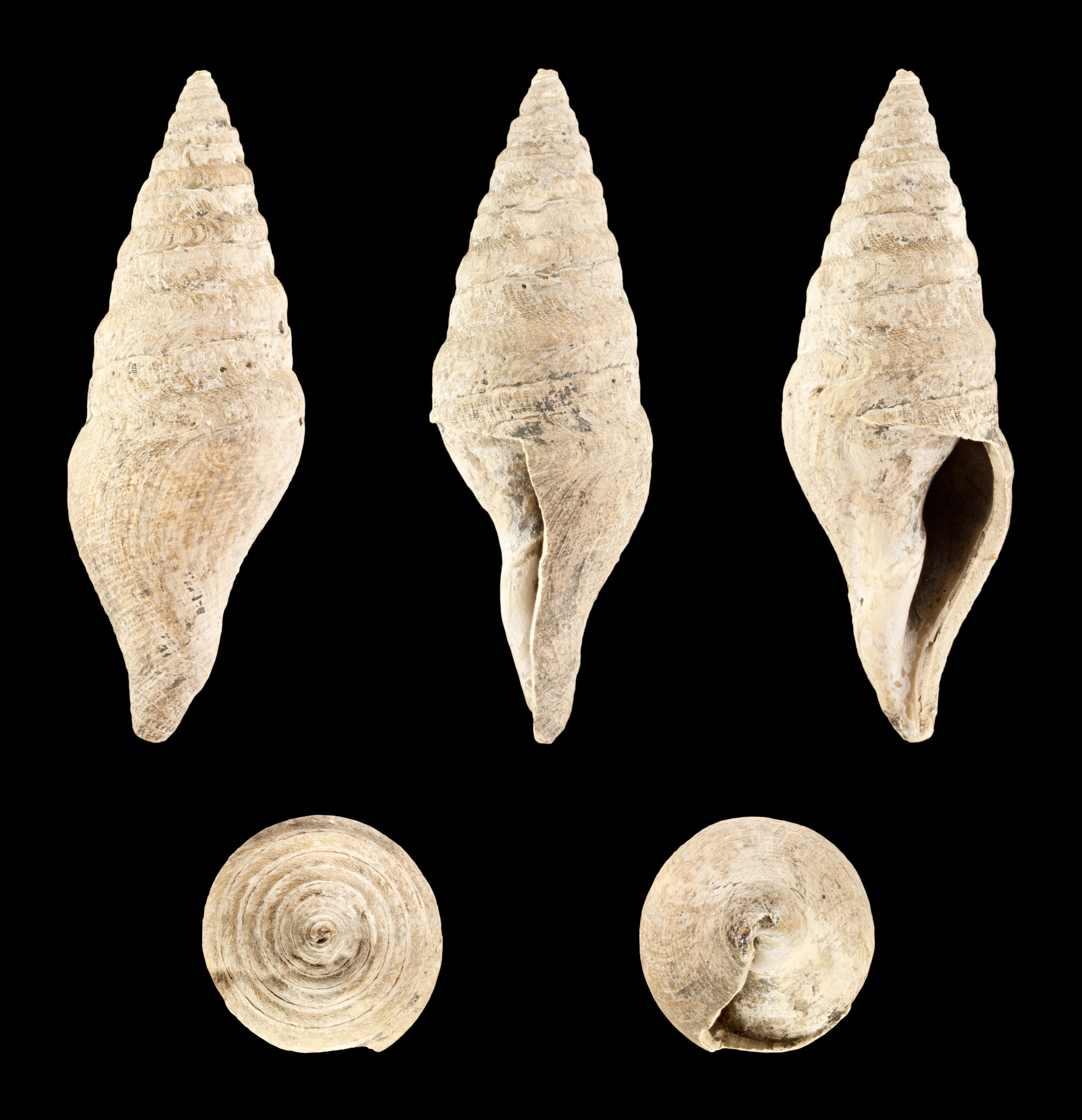
Turris steinvorthi

== Synonyms ==
- Turris abbreviata (Reeve, 1843): synonym of Lophiotoma abbreviata (Reeve, 1843)
- Turris abyssorum (Locard, 1897): synonym of Gymnobela abyssorum (Locard, 1897)
- Turris acuta (Perry, 1811): synonym of Lophiotoma acuta (Perry, 1811)
- Turris aelomitra Tinker, 1952: synonym of Gemmula monilifera (Pease, 1860) (unavailable name, a name found in collections only)
- Turris ankaramanyensis Bozzetti, 2006: synonym of Turris tanyspira Kilburn, 1975
- Turris annae (Hoernes & Auinger, 1891): synonym of Unedogemmula annae (Hoernes & Auinger, 1891)
- Turris antiope (W.H. Dall, 1918): synonym of Mangelia recta E.A. Smith, 1888; synonym of Pleurotoma antiope W.H. Dall, 1918
- Turris armilda Dall, 1908: synonym of Fusiturricula armilda (Dall, 1908)
- Turris assyria Olivera, Seronay & Fedosov, 2010: synonym of Turris babylonia (Linnaeus, 1758)
- Turris bairdii W.H. Dall, 1889: synonym of Volutomitra bairdii (W.H. Dall, 1889)
- † Turris bimarginatus Suter, 1917: synonym of † Gemmula bimarginata (Suter, 1917) (original combination)
- Turris beblammena (Sturany, 1903): synonym of Taranidaphne beblammena (Sturany, 1903)
- Turris binda Garrard, 1961: synonym of Unedogemmula unedo (Kiener, 1839)
- † Turris brassoensis Mansfield 1925: synonym of † Gemmula machapoorensis Maury 1925
- Turris cincta: synonym of Turridrupa cincta (Lamarck, 1822)
- Turris cingulifera: synonym of Iotyrris cingulifera (Lamarck, 1822)
- Turris clionellaeformis (Weinkauff & Kobelt, 1875): synonym of Drillia clionellaeformis (Weinkauff & Kobelt, 1875)
- Turris cosmoi Sykes, 1930: synonym of Gemmula cosmoi (Sykes, 1930)
- Turris cristata Vera-Pelaez et al., 2000: synonym of Purpuraturris cristata (Vera-Peláez, Vega-Luz & Lozano-Francisco, 2000)
- Turris cryptorrhaphe (Sowerby I, 1825): synonym of Purpuraturris cryptorraphe (G. B. Sowerby I, 1825) (superseded combination)
- † Turris denticula (Basterot, 1825): synonym of † Gemmula denticula (Basterot, 1825)
- Turris diaulax Dall, 1908: synonym of Rhodopetoma diaulax (Dall, 1908)
- Turris dolenta W.H. Dall, 1908synonym of Fusiturricula dolenta (W.H. Dall, 1908)
- Turris dollyae Olivera, 1999: synonym of Turris crispa (Lamarck, 1816)
- Turris diaulax Dall, 1908: synonym of Antiplanes diaulax (Dall, 1908)
- Turris dollyae B. M. Olivera, 1999: synonym of Turris crispa (Lamarck, 1816)
- Turris euryclea W.H. Dall, 1919: synonym of Agathotoma alcippe (W.H. Dall, 1918)
- Turris formosissima Smith E. A., 1915: synonym of Polystira formosissima (Smith E. A., 1915)
- Turris fusinella Dall, 1908: synonym of Fusiturricula fusinella (Dall, 1908)
- Turris gilchristi (G. B. Sowerby III, 1902): synonym of Gemmula gilchristi (G. B. Sowerby III, 1902)
- Turris halcyonis Dall, 1908: synonym of Ophiodermella inermis (Reeve, 1843)
- Turris husamaru Nomura, 1940: synonym of Gemmula husamaru (Nomura, 1940)
- Turris hyugaensis T. Shuto, 1961 : synonym of Kuroshioturris hyugaensis (Shuto, 1961)
- Turris imperfecti Röding, 1798: synonym of Turris babylonia (Röding, 1798)
- Turris indica Röding, 1798: synonym of Unedogemmula indica (Deshayes, 1833)
- Turris integra (Thiele, 1925): synonym of Crassispira integra Thiele, 1925
- Turris invicta Melvill, J.C. 1910: synonym of Unedogemmula unedo (Kiener, 1839)
- Turris joubini (Dautzenberg & Fischer, 1906): synonym of Corinnaeturris leucomata (Dall, 1881)
- Turris kilburni Vera-Pelaez et al., 2000: synonym of Turris pagasa Olivera, 2000
- Turris lignaria (G. B. Sowerby III, 1903): synonym of Drillia lignaria (G. B. Sowerby III, 1903)
- Turris lirata (W.H. Pease, 1869): synonym of Iotyrris cerithiformis (A.W.B. Powell, 1964)
- Turris lobata (G. B. Sowerby III, 1903): synonym of Ptychosyrinx lobata (G. B. Sowerby III, 1903): synonym of Cryptogemma praesignis (E. A. Smith, 1895)
- Turris locardi A.R.J.B. Bavay, 1906: synonym of Aphanitoma locardi (A.R.J.B. Bavay, 1906)
- Turris macella Melvill, 1923: synonym of Agladrillia macella (Melvill, 1923)
- Turris marmorata (J.B.P.A. Lamarck, 1816 ): synonym of Lophiotoma acuta (Perry, 1811)
- Turris monilifera Pease, 1860: synonym of Gemmula monilifera (Pease, 1860)
- Turris munizi Vera-Pelaez et al., 2000: synonym of Gemmula lululimi Olivera, 2000
- Turris nadaensis M. Azuma, 1973: synonym of Purpuraturris nadensis (M. Azuma, 1973)
- Turris nexilis Hutton, 1885: synonym of Taranis nexilis (Hutton, 1885)
- Turris nobilis Röding, 1798: synonym of Turris babylonia (Linnaeus, 1758)
- Turris nodifera (Lamarck, 1822): synonym of Turricula javana (Linnaeus, 1767) (combination of M.Smith, 1940)
- Turris notilla W.H. Dall, 1908: synonym of Fusiturricula notilla (W.H. Dall, 1908) -
- Turris omnipurpurata Vera-Pelaez et al., 2000: synonym of Purpuraturris omnipurpurata (Vera-Peláez, Vega-Luz & Lozano-Francisco, 2000)
- Turris orthopleura Kilburn, 1983: synonym of Makiyamaia orthopleura (Kilburn, 1983)
- Turris operosa Röding, 1798: synonym of Doxander operosus (Röding, 1798) (original combination)
- † Turris panarica A.A. Olsson, 1942 : synonym of † Buridrillia panarica (A.A. Olsson, 1942)
- † Turris paracantha J.E. Tenison-Woods, 1877: synonym of † Bathytoma paracantha (J.E. Tenison-Woods, 1877)
- Turris pluteata Reeve: synonym of Fusiturris pluteata (Reeve, 1843)
- Turris pseudogranosa Nomura, 1940: synonym of Gemmula pseudogranosa (Nomura, 1940)
- Turris pulchra Röding, 1798: synonym of Turris babylonia (Linnaeus, 1758)
- Turris queenslandis A.W.B. Powell, 1969: synonym of Zemacies queenslandica (A.W.B. Powell, 1969)
- Turris raffrayi C.M. Tapparone-Canefri, 1878: synonym of Turris babylonia (C. Linnaeus, 1758)
- Turris regia Röding, 1798: synonym of Clavatula regia (Röding, 1798)
- † Turris regularis Koninck, 1837; synonym of † Orthosurcula regularis (Koninck, 1837)
- Turris resina Dall, 1908: synonym of Hindsiclava resina (Dall, 1908)
- Turris rugitecta Dall, 1918: synonym of Crassispira rugitecta (Dall, 1918)
- Turris ruthveniana Melvill, 1923: synonym of Lophiotoma ruthveniana (Melvill, 1923)
- Turris saldanhae Barnard, 1958: synonym of Comitas saldanhae (Barnard, 1958)
- Turris solomonensis (Smith E. A., 1876): synonym of Inquisitor solomonensis (E. A. Smith, 1876)
- Turris stolida (Hinds, 1843): synonym of Comitas stolida (Hinds, 1843)
- † Turris subconcava (G.F. Harris, 1897) : synonym of † Xenuroturris subconcavus (G.F. Harris, 1897)
- Turris tanyspira Kilburn, 1975: synonym of Purpuraturris tanyspira (Kilburn, 1975)
- Turris taxea Röding, 1798: synonym of Clavatula taxea (Röding, 1798)
- Turris tigrina Lamarck: synonym of Lophiotoma indica (Röding, 1798)
- Turris tornatum Röding, 1798: synonym of Turris babylonia (Linnaeus, 1758)
- Turris torta Dautzenberg: synonym of Fusiturris torta (Dautzenberg, 1912)
- Turris totiphyllis Oliverio, 1999: synonym of Turris hidalgoi Vera-Pelaez, Vega-Luz & Lozano-Francisco, 2000
- Turris undatiruga Bivona: synonym of Fusiturris undatiruga (Bivona Ant. in Bivona And., 1838)
- Turris undosa (Lamarck, 1816): synonym of Purpuraturris undosa (Lamarck, 1816) (superseded combination)
- Turris unedo (Kiener, 1839): synonym of Unedogemmula unedo (Kiener, 1839)
- Turris violacea: synonym of Tomopleura reevii (C. B. Adams, 1850)
- Turris woodii L.C. Kiener, 1840: synonym of Purpuraturris cryptorraphe (G.B. Sowerby I, 1825)
