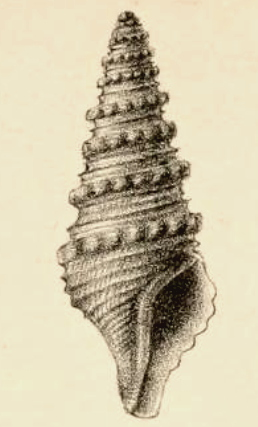
- Shell of Turris proesignis (holotype)

Scientific classification
- Kingdom: Animalia
- Phylum: Mollusca
- Class: Gastropoda
- Subclass: Caenogastropoda
- Order: Neogastropoda
- Superfamily: Conoidea
- Family: Turridae
- Genus: Turris
- Species: T. proesignis

Binomial name
- Turris proesignis (E.A. Smith, 1895)

Synonyms
- Pleurotoma proesignis E.A. Smith, 1895

= Turris proesignis =

Species of gastropod

Turris proesignis is a species of sea snail, a marine gastropod mollusk in the family Turridae, the turrids.

== Description ==
The length of the shell attains 42 mm; its maximum diameter: 15 mm.

The prominent row of tubercles around the middle of the whorls, the keel beneath the suture, and the broad sinus in the outer lip are the principal features of this species. The apex of the spire is broken. This makes it impossible to state with certainty the exact number of whorls, but they would probably amount to eleven or twelve. The entire surface exhibits fine flexuous lines of growth.

== Distribution ==
This bathypelagic species occurs off Sri Lanka.
