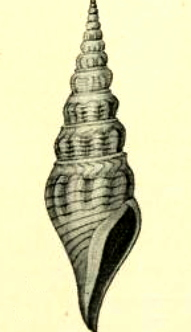
- Drawing a shell of Turris altispira

Scientific classification
- Kingdom: Animalia
- Phylum: Mollusca
- Class: Gastropoda
- Subclass: Caenogastropoda
- Order: Neogastropoda
- Superfamily: Conoidea
- Family: Turridae
- Genus: Turris
- Species: T. altispira

Binomial name
- Turris altispira (May, 1922)

= Turris altispira =

Species of gastropod

Turris altispira is an extinct species of sea snail, a marine gastropod mollusk in the family Turridae, the turrids.

C. Hedley (1922) was of the opinion that this species may belong to the genus Turricula.

== Description ==
The length of the shell attains 21 mm.

(Original description) The narrowly fusiform shell has a very high attenuate spire, which is nearly twice the length of the aperture. It contains about 13 rounded whorls. The suture is impressed, with a broad groove, or hollow immediately below it. The sculpture consists of well developed axial ribs, about six on a half-turn. These are crossed on the lower half of the whorl by four spirals, which nodulate the ribs. The upper slope being nearly smooth, but showing the growth lines of the sinus which occupied this position. The spiral lirae continue on the base. The aperture is narrow, contracted anteriorly into a siphonal canal. The outer lip is imperfect.

== Distribution ==
This extinct marine species was found in Miocene strata in Tasmania, Australia.
