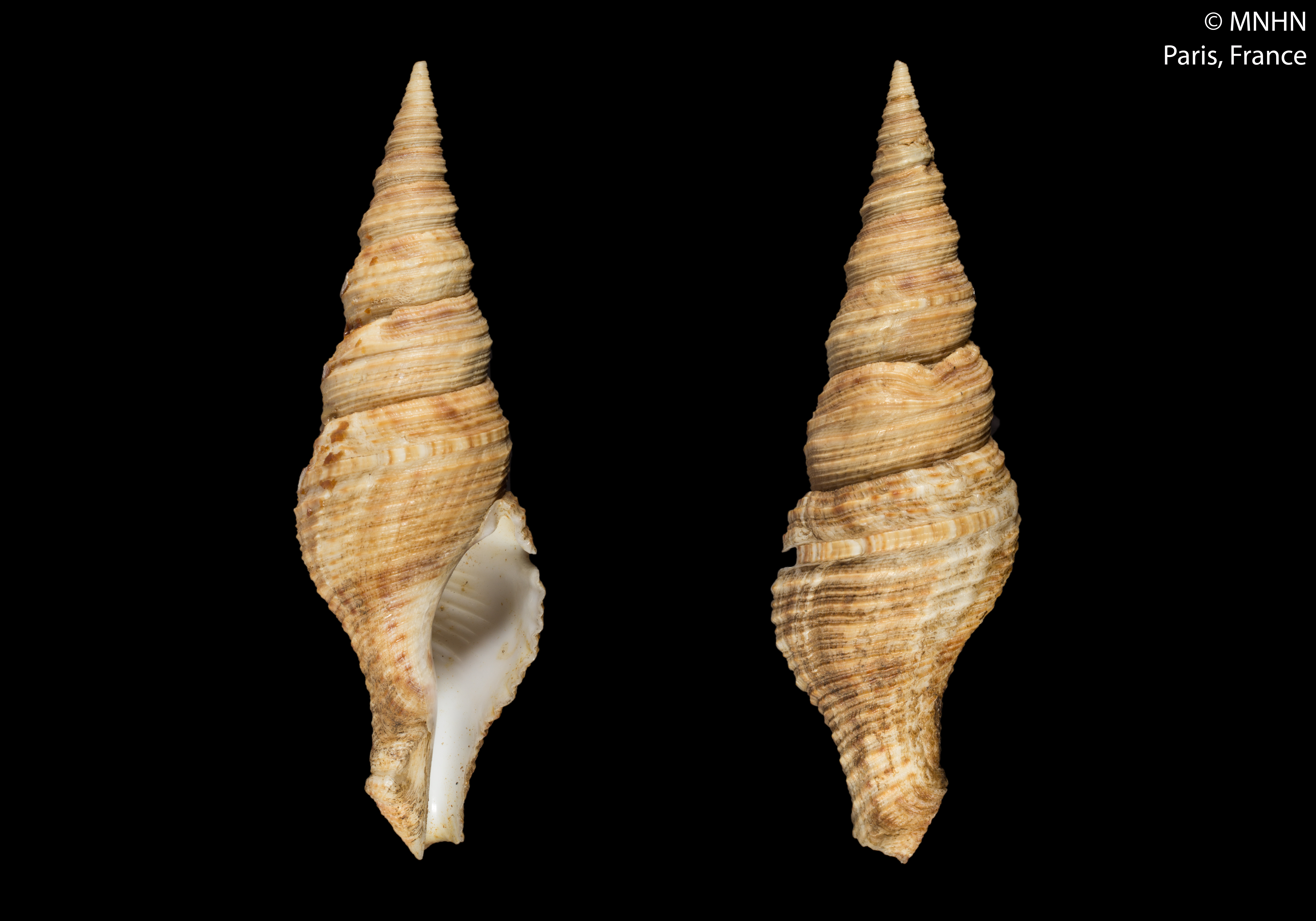
- Shell of Turris bipartita (syntype at MNHN, Paris)

Scientific classification
- Kingdom: Animalia
- Phylum: Mollusca
- Class: Gastropoda
- Subclass: Caenogastropoda
- Order: Neogastropoda
- Superfamily: Conoidea
- Family: Turridae
- Genus: Turris
- Species: T. bipartita

Binomial name
- Turris bipartita Kilburn, Fedosov & B. M. Olivera, 2012

Synonyms
- Pleurotoma indica Deshayes, 1833 · (invalid: junior secondary homonym of Turris indica Röding, 1798); Pleurotoma variegata Kiener, 1839 (non Philippi, 1836) (junior homonym of Pleurotoma variegata Philippi, 1836; Turris bipartita is a replacement name)

= Turris bipartita =

Species of gastropod

Turris bipartita is a species of sea snail, a marine gastropod mollusk in the family Turridae, the turrids.

== Description ==
The length of the shell varies between 20 mm and 31 mm.

== Distribution ==
This marine species occurs off India.
