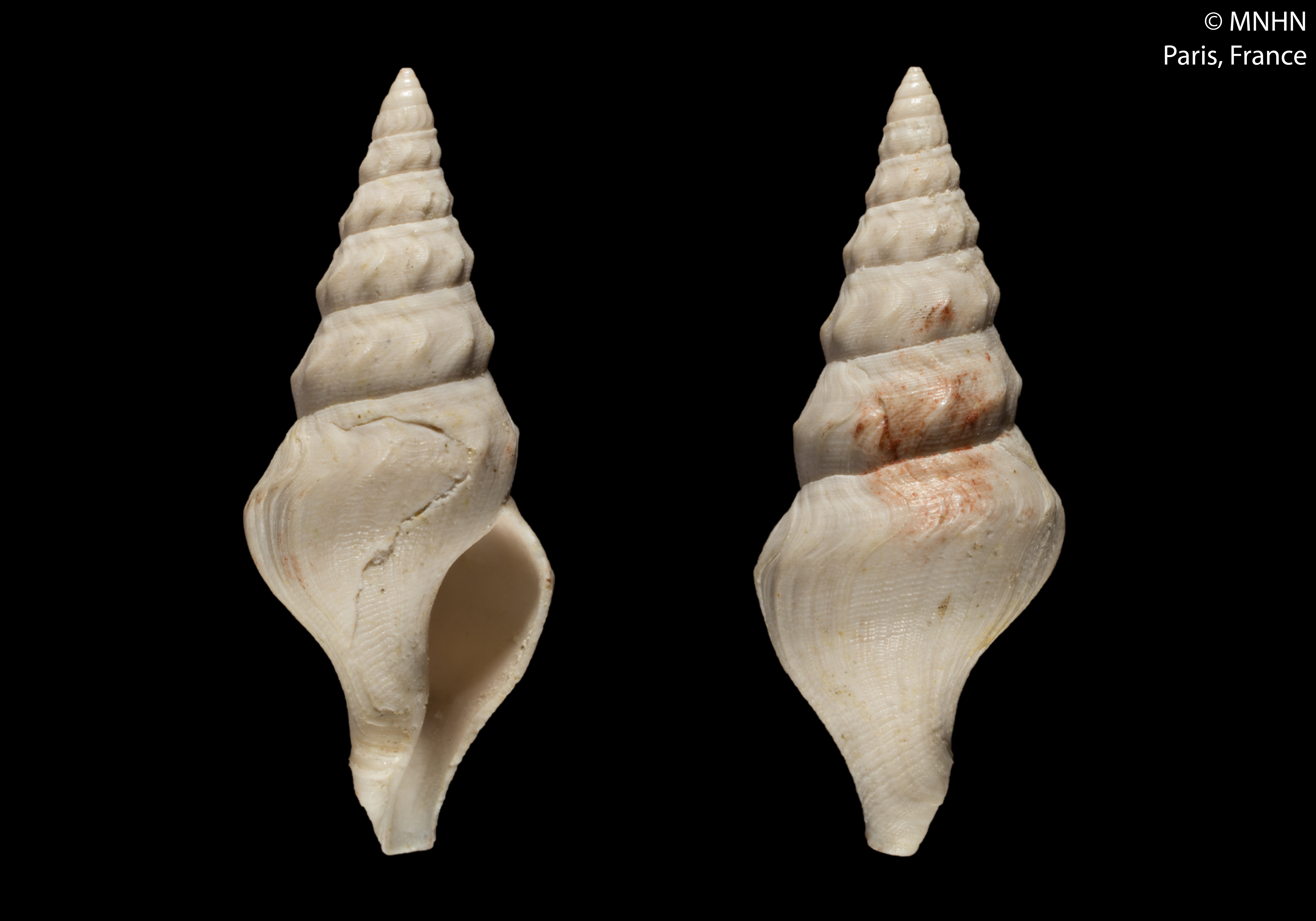
- Shell of Turris baudoni (holotype at MNHN, Paris)

Scientific classification
- Kingdom: Animalia
- Phylum: Mollusca
- Class: Gastropoda
- Subclass: Caenogastropoda
- Order: Neogastropoda
- Superfamily: Conoidea
- Family: Turridae
- Genus: Turris
- Species: T. baudoni

Binomial name
- Turris baudoni (Deshayes 1866)

Synonyms
- Pleurotoma baudoni Deshayes 1866

= Turris baudoni =

Species of gastropod

Turris baudoni is an extinct species of sea snail, a marine gastropod mollusk in the family Turridae, the turrids.

== Distribution ==
Fossils of this marine species were found in Eocene strata off Paris, France.
