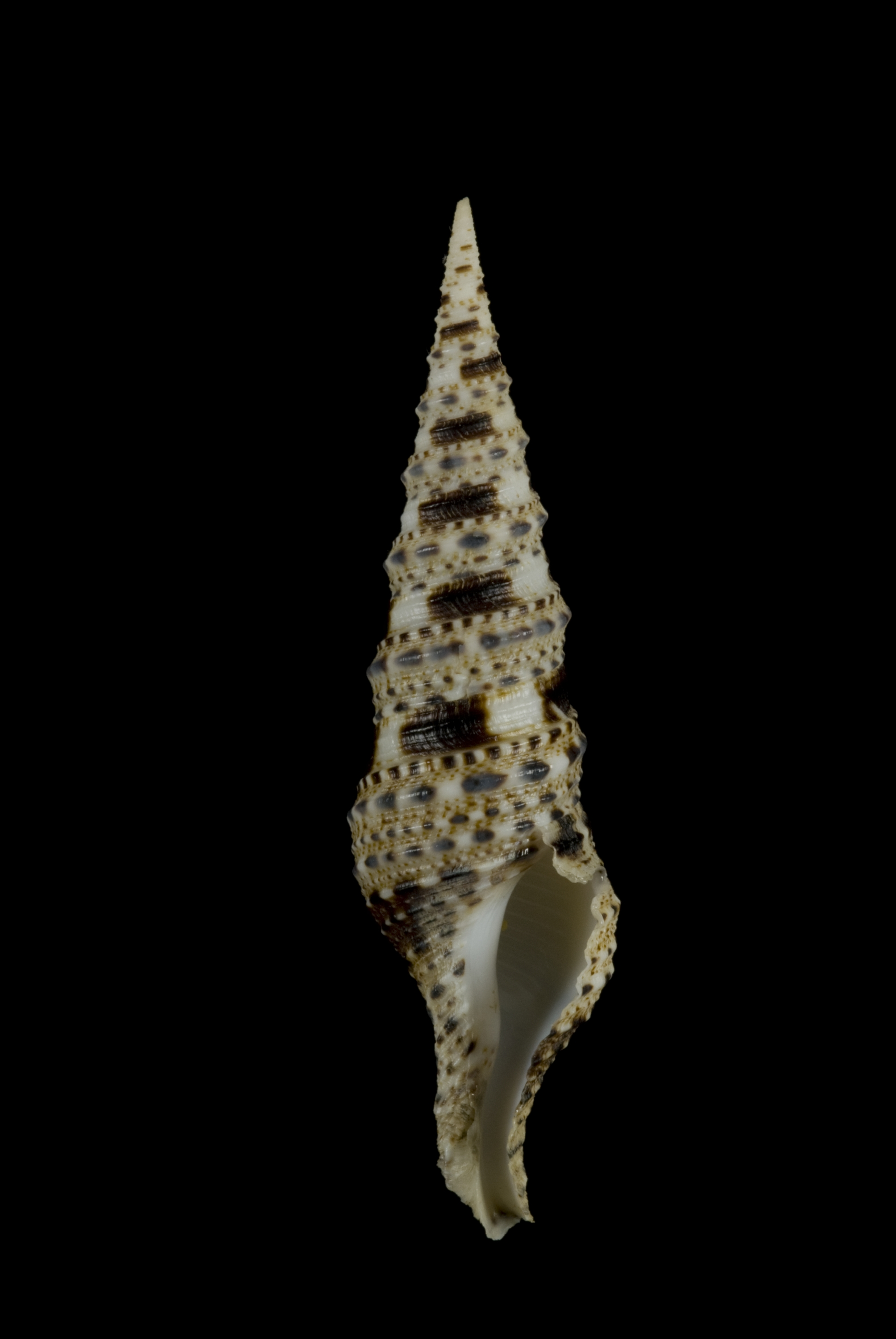
- Shell of Turris condei (specimen at MNHN, Paris)

Scientific classification
- Kingdom: Animalia
- Phylum: Mollusca
- Class: Gastropoda
- Subclass: Caenogastropoda
- Order: Neogastropoda
- Family: Turridae
- Genus: Turris
- Species: T. condei

Binomial name
- Turris condei Vera-Pelaez et al., 2000

= Turris condei =

Species of gastropod

Turris condei is a species of sea snail, a marine gastropod mollusk in the family Turridae, the turrids. They reside within shallow waters, typically no deeper than 10m.

== Description ==
The length of the shell attains 50 to 75mm.

== Distribution ==
This marine species occurs off India, the Solomon Islands, New Guinea, and Mozambique.
