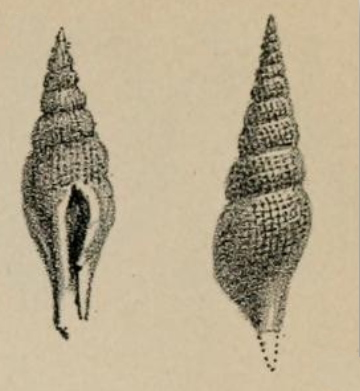
- Shell of Turris perkinsiana (holotype)

Scientific classification
- Kingdom: Animalia
- Phylum: Mollusca
- Class: Gastropoda
- Subclass: Caenogastropoda
- Order: Neogastropoda
- Superfamily: Conoidea
- Family: Turridae
- Genus: Turris
- Species: T. perkinsiana

Binomial name
- Turris perkinsiana (Cooper 1894)

Synonyms
- Pleurotoma perkinsiana Cooper, 1894 (original combination)

= Turris perkinsiana =

Species of gastropod

Turris perkinsiana is an extinct species of sea snail, a marine gastropod mollusk in the family Turridae, the turrids.

== Description ==
The length of the shell attains 15.2 mm; the maximum diameter is 3.81 mm; the aperture is about 6.3 mm long.

(Original description) The shell is very long and slender. It contains about ten rounded whorls. The first two are turbinate, smooth. The third shows ten or twelve close-set vertical riblets, crossed by eight or ten revolving ones, the vertical gradually increasing to twenty-six on the body whorl, forming a close beaded sculpture as far as the middle of body-whorl, while the revolving ribs continue alone on the body to the siphonal canal. It varies also in relative strength of the two series of riblets, at different portions of the spire. The sinus is close to the suture The siphonal canal is straight. The columella is simple.

== Distribution ==
Fossils of this marine species were found in Eocene strata in California, USA (age range: 55.8 to 48.6 Ma)
