= Turris hornesi =

Scientific classification
- Kingdom: Animalia
- Phylum: Mollusca
- Class: Gastropoda
- Subclass: Caenogastropoda
- Order: Neogastropoda
- Superfamily: Conoidea
- Family: Turridae
- Genus: Turris
- Species: T. hornesi

Binomial name
- Turris hornesi (Deshayes 1866)

Synonyms
- Pleurotoma hornesi Deshayes 1866

Species of gastropod

Turris hornesi is an extinct species of sea snail, a marine gastropod mollusk in the family Turridae, the turrids.
