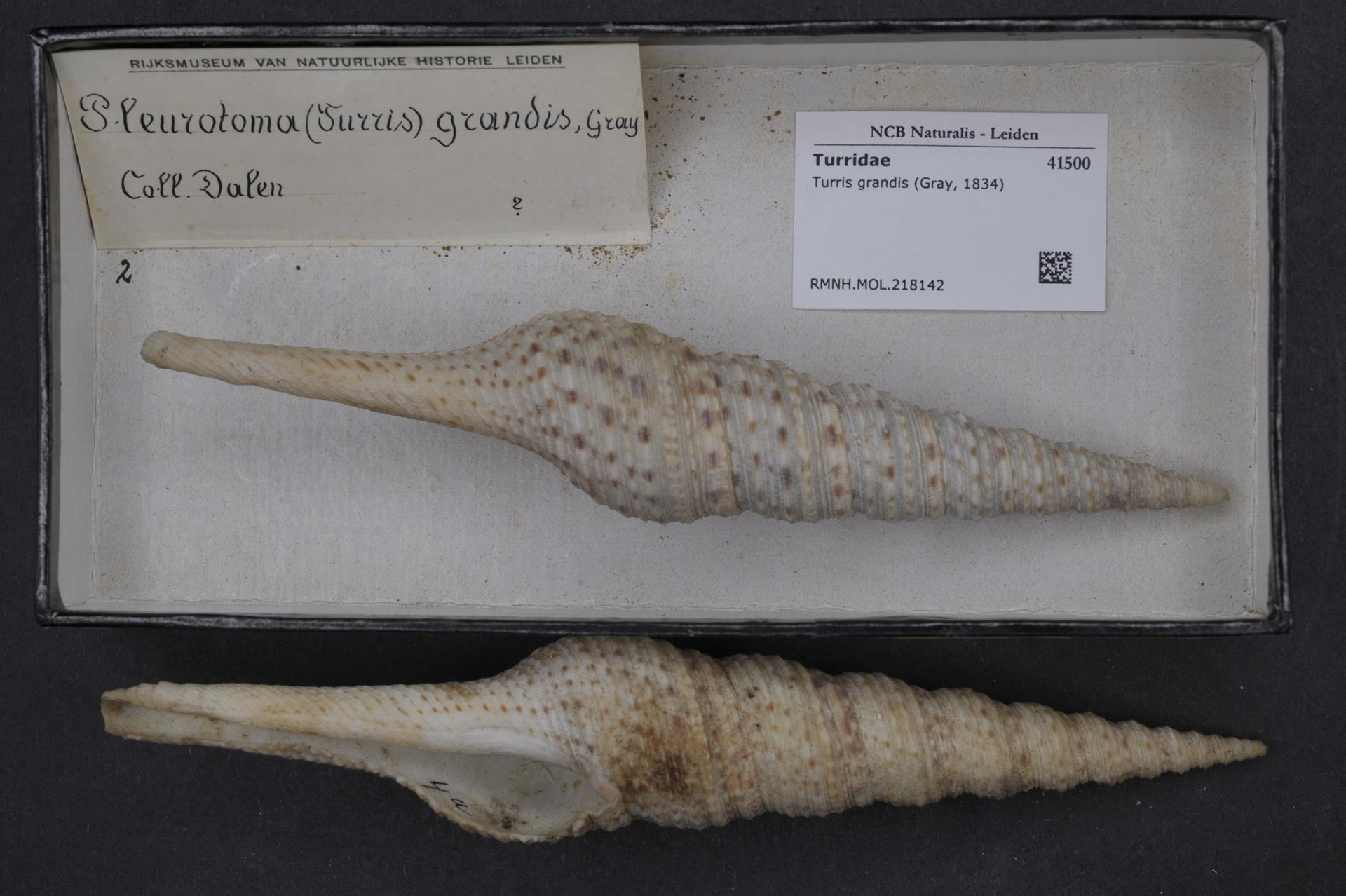
- Shell of Turris grandis (specimen at Naturalis Biodiversity Center)

Scientific classification
- Kingdom: Animalia
- Phylum: Mollusca
- Class: Gastropoda
- Subclass: Caenogastropoda
- Order: Neogastropoda
- Family: Turridae
- Genus: Turris
- Species: T. grandis

Binomial name
- Turris grandis (Gray J.E., 1834)

Synonyms
- Pleurotoma grandis Gray, 1834

= Turris grandis =

Species of gastropod

Turris grandis is a species of sea snail, a marine gastropod mollusk in the family Turridae, the turrids.

== Description ==
The size of an adult shell varies between 100 mm and 180 mm

The whorls are not much angulated. The sculpture of the shell shows many rather small sharp revolving ribs and intermediate raised lines. The color of the shell is yellowish white with numerous with chestnut-brown spots upon the larger ribs, the spots often coalescing into irregular longitudinal stripes.

== Distribution ==
This species occurs in the Pacific Ocean off the Philippines and in the Andaman Sea and the South China Sea.
