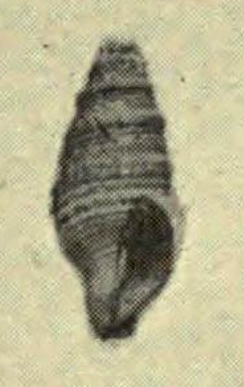
- Shell of Turris thurstonensis (holotype)

Scientific classification
- Kingdom: Animalia
- Phylum: Mollusca
- Class: Gastropoda
- Subclass: Caenogastropoda
- Order: Neogastropoda
- Superfamily: Conoidea
- Family: Turridae
- Genus: Turris
- Species: T. thurstonensis

Binomial name
- Turris thurstonensis Weaver 1916

= Turris thurstonensis =

Species of gastropod

Turris thurstonensis is an extinct species of sea snail, a marine gastropod mollusk in the family Turridae, the turrids.

== Description ==
The lmength of the shell attains 17 mm; the altitude of the spire 11 mm; maximum diameter of the shell 6 mm.

(Original description) The small and moderately elongated shell contains seven whorls, all of which are ornamented. There are three revolving folds upon the body whorl. The posterior surface of whorls at the suture are nearly at right angles to the axis of spire. The middle portion of the surfaceis nearly at right angles to the posterior surface and forms a sharply angulated ridge. From this ridge the surface is slightly concave to the broadly rounded middle angle of the whorl. Between the middle and anterior angles there is a narrow flat surfaced groove containing a single faint revolving rib. The anterior surface of the whorl is sculptured by ten poorly defined revolving ribs and interspaces of equal width. The longitudinal ribs are absent with the exception of wavy lines of growth which conform to the curvature of the posterior sinus. The aperture is moderately elongate and slightly wider posteriorly than anteriorly. The anterior end opens in a form of a wide but slightly twisted siphonal canal. The outer lip is smooth. The inner lip is very slightly callused and contains a well defined axial groove extending from the end of the canal to the posterior end of the aperture. The surface of the whorl extends up sharply to and terminates at the groove.

== Distribution ==
Fossils of this marine species were found in Oligocene strata in Washington, USA
