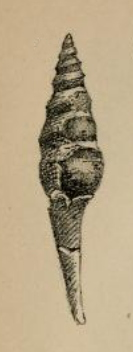
- Shell of Turris inconstans (holotype)

Scientific classification
- Kingdom: Animalia
- Phylum: Mollusca
- Class: Gastropoda
- Subclass: Caenogastropoda
- Order: Neogastropoda
- Superfamily: Conoidea
- Family: Turridae
- Genus: Turris
- Species: T. inconstans

Binomial name
- Turris inconstans (Cooper, 1894)

Synonyms
- Surcula inconstans Cooper,1894

= Turris inconstans =

Species of gastropod

Turris inconstans is an extinct species of sea snail, a marine gastropod mollusk in the family Turridae, the turrids.

== Description ==
The length of the shell attains 28 mm; the maximum diameter is 6.4 mm.

(Original description) The long, fusiform shell contains about 10 whorls. The first two whorls are turbinate, smooth. The third to sixth whorls show ten or twelve transverse close-set ribs, which, on the other four whorls, show only on the posterior half of each, being replaced by eight or ten revolving riblets, forming a cancellated sculpture near middle, and toward the siphonal canal appearing alone. The aperture is narrow with a sinus at angle. The siphonal canal is long.

== Distribution ==
Fossils of this marine species were found in Eocene strata in California, USA (age range: 55.8 to 48.6 Ma)
