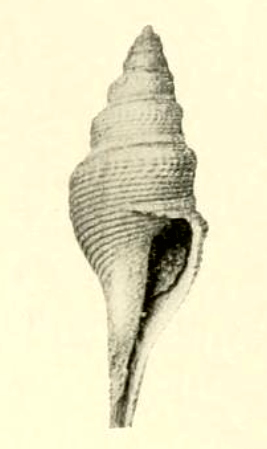
- Shell of Turris pulchra (holotype)

Scientific classification
- Kingdom: Animalia
- Phylum: Mollusca
- Class: Gastropoda
- Subclass: Caenogastropoda
- Order: Neogastropoda
- Superfamily: Conoidea
- Family: Turridae
- Genus: Turris
- Species: T. pulchra

Binomial name
- Turris pulchra Dickerson 1915

Synonyms
- Hemipleurotoma pulchra Dickerson 1915

= Turris pulchra =

Species of gastropod

Turris pulchra is an extinct species of sea snail, a marine gastropod mollusk in the family Turridae, the turrids.

== Description ==
Measurements of the shell: 20.0 mm x 6.5 mm.

(Original description) The fusiform shell contains nine whorls. The first four are turbo-form and smooth. The others are sharply angulated by a shoulder a third of whorl below the suture. They are decorated by twelve to fourteen subequal spiral lines which are slightly nodose where the fine sinuous axial ribs cross them. A beaded sutural collar occurs just below the indistinct suture. The aperture is elongate with its greatest width above, narrowing below into a slender siphonal canal. The outer lip is thin. The inner lip is slightly calloused.

== Distribution ==
Fossils of this marine species were found in Eocene strata in Oregon and Washington, USA (age range:40.4 to 37.2 Ma)
