= Turris andersoni =

Scientific classification
- Kingdom: Animalia
- Phylum: Mollusca
- Class: Gastropoda
- Subclass: Caenogastropoda
- Order: Neogastropoda
- Superfamily: Conoidea
- Family: Turridae
- Genus: Turris
- Species: T. andersoni

Binomial name
- Turris andersoni Dickerson 1913

Species of gastropod

Turris andersoni is an extinct species of sea snail, a marine gastropod mollusk in the family Turridae, the turrids.

== Distribution ==
This extinct marine species was found in Eocene strata in California (55.8 to 48.6 Ma).
