= Turris aequensis =

Scientific classification
- Kingdom: Animalia
- Phylum: Mollusca
- Class: Gastropoda
- Subclass: Caenogastropoda
- Order: Neogastropoda
- Superfamily: Conoidea
- Family: Turridae
- Genus: Turris
- Species: T. aequensis

Binomial name
- Turris aequensis (Grateloup, 1832)

Species of gastropod

Turris aequensis is an extinct species of sea snail, a marine gastropod mollusk in the family Turridae, the turrids.

== Description ==
The length of the shell attains 26 mm.

== Distribution ==
This extinct marine species was found in Miocene strata in Aquitaine, France.
