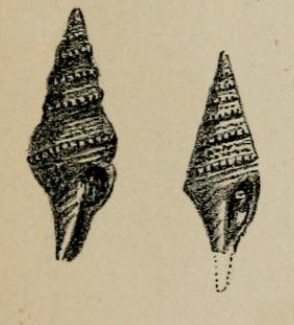
- Shell of Turris monilifera (holotype)

Scientific classification
- Kingdom: Animalia
- Phylum: Mollusca
- Class: Gastropoda
- Subclass: Caenogastropoda
- Order: Neogastropoda
- Superfamily: Conoidea
- Family: Turridae
- Genus: Turris
- Species: T. monilifera

Binomial name
- Turris monilifera (Cooper 1894)

Synonyms
- Surcula monilifera Cooper, 1894 (original combination)

= Turris monilifera =

Species of gastropod

Turris monilifera is an extinct species of sea snail, a marine gastropod mollusk in the family Turridae, the turrids.

== Description ==
The length of the shell attains 15,2 mm, its maximum diameter is 2 mm; the aperture and the siphonal canal are 8.6 mm long.

(Original description) The shell has a fusiform shape. The three, conical whorls of the protoconch are smooth. The next whorls are crossed by twelve or more strong, oblique riblets, which change on fourth or fifth into a row of beaded knobs, forming an angle along middle of whorls, increasing to thirty-five on ninth whorl or body whorl. Above this angle are nine or ten fine revolving riblets, and three or four below it, the two posterior being longest, and imperfectly beaded at the suture. On the anterior whorls the medial knobs are sometimes doubled, and on the bod -whorl the revolving riblets are alternately large and small. The siphonal canal is straight, equaling the sub-oval mouth in length. The sinus is deep and is situated at the angle.

== Distribution ==
Fossils of this marine species were found in Eocene strata in California, USA (age range: 55.8 to 37.2 Ma)
