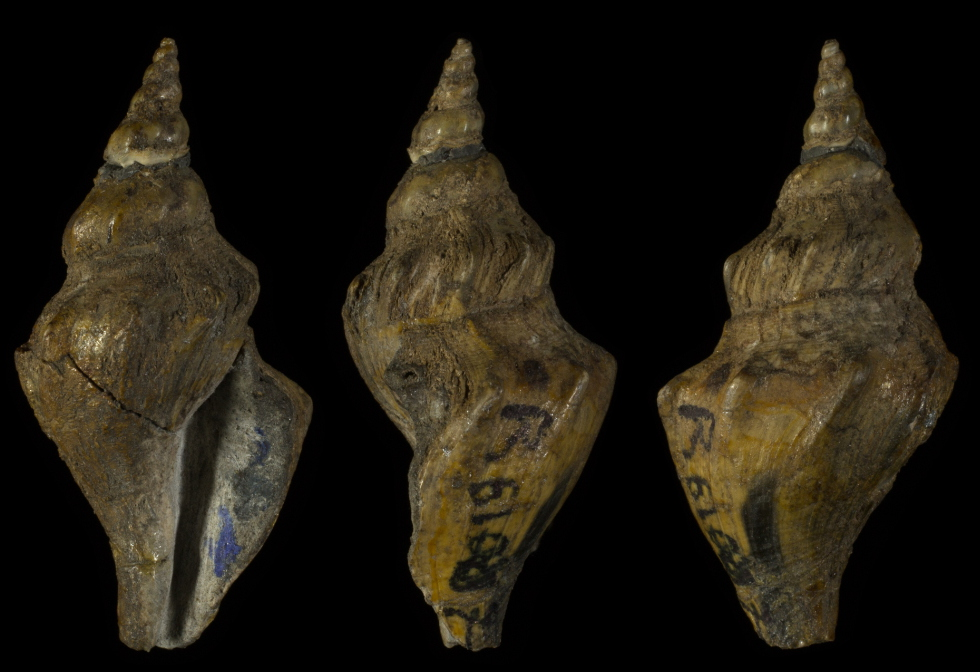
- Shell of Turris aenigmaticus (holotype at MNHN, Paris)

Scientific classification
- Kingdom: Animalia
- Phylum: Mollusca
- Class: Gastropoda
- Subclass: Caenogastropoda
- Order: Neogastropoda
- Superfamily: Conoidea
- Family: Turridae
- Genus: Turris
- Species: T. aenigmaticus

Binomial name
- Turris aenigmaticus Dartevelle (E.) & Brébion (P.), 1956

= Turris aenigmaticus =

Species of gastropod

Turris aenigmaticus is an extinct species of sea snail, a marine gastropod mollusk in the family Turridae, the turrids.

== Distribution ==
This extinct marine species was found in Cretaceous strata in Cameroun
