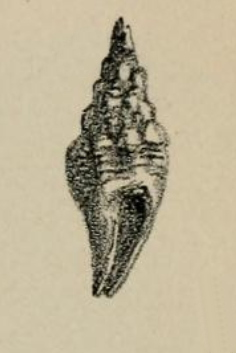
- Shell of Turris suturalis (holotype)

Scientific classification
- Kingdom: Animalia
- Phylum: Mollusca
- Class: Gastropoda
- Subclass: Caenogastropoda
- Order: Neogastropoda
- Superfamily: Conoidea
- Family: Turridae
- Genus: Turris
- Species: T. suturalis

Binomial name
- Turris suturalis (Cooper 1894)

Synonyms
- Mangilia suturalis Cooper, 1894 (original combination)

= Turris suturalis =

Species of gastropod

Turris suturalis is an extinct species of sea snail, a marine gastropod mollusk in the family Turridae, the turrids.

== Description ==
The length of the shell attains 14 mm; its maximum diameter is 2 mm; the aperture is 7.4 mm long.

(Original description) The shell has a lanceolate shape. The protoconch contains three whorls. The fourth whorls contains ten strong vertical riblets, continuing on the next five whorls, but decreasing to six on the body whorl. They cross the entire whorl, but higher at the middle, forming an obtuse angle, marked by a strong revolving riblet. One strong riblet parallel to this is close to the suture, and one below the angle. On the body they increase to over twenty of uniform size. Strong lines of growth cross these throughout, showing a deep sinus, mostly posterior to the angle. The siphonal canal is slightly twisted.

== Distribution ==
Fossils of this marine species were found in Eocene strata in California, USA (age range: 55.8 to 48.6 Ma)
