= Turris garoensis =

Scientific classification
- Kingdom: Animalia
- Phylum: Mollusca
- Class: Gastropoda
- Subclass: Caenogastropoda
- Order: Neogastropoda
- Superfamily: Conoidea
- Family: Turridae
- Genus: Turris
- Species: †T. garoensis

Binomial name
- †Turris garoensis Mukerjee 1939

Species of gastropod

Turris garoensis is an extinct species of sea snail, a marine gastropod mollusk in the family Turridae, the turrids.

== Description ==
The length of the shell attains 57 mm.

== Distribution ==
Fossils of this marine species were found in Miocene strata in Assam, India (age range: 23.03 to 15.97 Ma)
