= Turris adendanii =

Scientific classification
- Kingdom: Animalia
- Phylum: Mollusca
- Class: Gastropoda
- Subclass: Caenogastropoda
- Order: Neogastropoda
- Superfamily: Conoidea
- Family: Turridae
- Genus: Turris
- Species: T. adendanii

Binomial name
- Turris adendanii Abbass 1967

Species of gastropod

Turris adendanii is an extinct species of sea snail, a marine gastropod mollusk in the family Turridae, the turrids.

== Description ==
Measurements of the shell 21.0 x 6.5 mm.

== Distribution ==
This extinct marine species was found in Eocene strata in Egypt (48.6 to 40.4 Ma).
