= Turris farouqui =

Scientific classification
- Kingdom: Animalia
- Phylum: Mollusca
- Class: Gastropoda
- Subclass: Caenogastropoda
- Order: Neogastropoda
- Superfamily: Conoidea
- Family: Turridae
- Genus: Turris
- Species: T. farouqui

Binomial name
- Turris farouqui Abbass 1977

Species of gastropod

Turris farouqui is an extinct species of sea snail, a marine gastropod mollusk in the family Turridae, the turrids.

== Description ==
The length of the shell attains 28 mm.

== Distribution ==
Fossils of this species were found in Vindobonian strata at Geneifa, Egypt.
