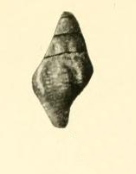
- Shell of Turris plicata (holotype)

Scientific classification
- Kingdom: Animalia
- Phylum: Mollusca
- Class: Gastropoda
- Subclass: Caenogastropoda
- Order: Neogastropoda
- Superfamily: Conoidea
- Family: Turridae
- Genus: Turris
- Species: T. plicata

Binomial name
- Turris plicata Waring 1917

= Turris plicata =

Species of gastropod

Turris plicata is an extinct species of sea snail, a marine gastropod mollusk in the family Turridae, the turrids.

== Description ==
(Original description) The thick shell is elongate and has a fusiform shape. The spire is high. It contains seven whorls. The suture is indistinct. The whorls are marked by rounded folds, as large as the interspaces, which run slightly diagonally backward, and are crossed by distinct spiral ribs which also cover the siphonal canal. The aperture is elongated, widest above and tapering down to the siphonal canal.

== Distribution ==
Fossils of this marine species were found in Paleogene strata in the Chatsworth Formation, California, USA (age range:84.9 to 70.6 Ma)
