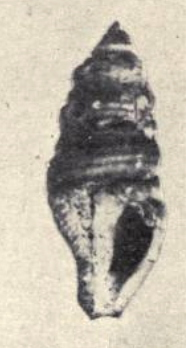
- Shell of Turris worcesteri (holotype)

Scientific classification
- Kingdom: Animalia
- Phylum: Mollusca
- Class: Gastropoda
- Subclass: Caenogastropoda
- Order: Neogastropoda
- Superfamily: Conoidea
- Family: Turridae
- Genus: Turris
- Species: T. worcesteri

Binomial name
- Turris worcesteri Van Winkle 1918

Synonyms
- Suavodrillia worcesteri (Van Winkle, 1918)

= Turris worcesteri =

Species of gastropod

Turris worcesteri is an extinct species of sea snail, a marine gastropod mollusk in the family Turridae, the turrids.

== Description ==
Dimensions: altitude of shell 10 mm; altitude of spire 1 mm; maximum diameter of shell 11 mm; angle of spire 41.

(Original description) The shell is small or slender and contains six or seven whorls. The middle portion of the whorls are marked by broad, sharply angulated, revolving folds. On the surface between these folds and the suture are two revolving ribs. The body whorl is ornamented with 14 revolving ribs with interspaces of equal width. The first two ribs just below the prominent revolving fold are moderately prominent, the others decreasing in size as they approach the anterior end. The aperture is elongate-elliptical, wider posteriorly. The siphonal canal is short, wide and twisted to the left. The inner lip is calloused.

This species differs from Turris thurstonensis (Weaver, 1916) in the fact that in all specimens of the species there are two constant revolving ribs between the suture and the angulated portion of the whorls. The intercalary threads are also absent between the revolving threads. The adult specimens of the species are smaller than in the case of Turris thurstonensis.

== Distribution ==
Fossils of this marine species were found in Eocene strata in Washington, USA. (Age range: 37.2 to 33.9 Ma).
