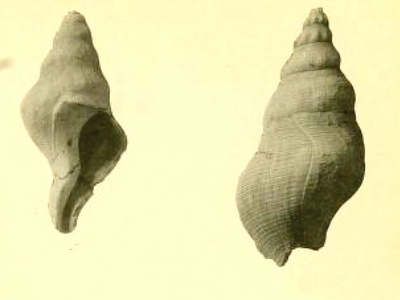
- Shell of † Turris carlsoni (holotype)

Scientific classification
- Kingdom: Animalia
- Phylum: Mollusca
- Class: Gastropoda
- Subclass: Caenogastropoda
- Order: Neogastropoda
- Superfamily: Conoidea
- Family: Turridae
- Genus: Turris
- Species: T. carlsoni

Binomial name
- Turris carlsoni Anderson and Martin 1914

= Turris carlsoni =

Species of gastropod

Turris carlsoni is an extinct species of sea snail, a marine gastropod mollusk in the family Turridae, the turrids.

== Description ==
The length of the figured specimen, (apex and siphonal canal defective) is 43 mm.; the width of the body whorl, 24 mm.

(Original description) The large and solid shell has a fusiform shape. It contains about eight whorls. The spire is high, with an acute apex. The whorls of the spire show a subdued angular appearance below the middle. They are slightly concave above and convex below. They are ornamented with a row of nodes on the angulation, and numerous spiral striations somewhat alternating in prominence. The suture is appressed, bordered by a sutural collar. The body whorl is ventricose, convex near the middle of the whorl, with inconspicuous or obsolete nodes, spiral sculpture the same as on the upper whorls. On some specimens the lower portion of the body whorl is marked by raised spiral cords and intercalary lines in place of the incised lines or striations. The aperture is oval, with a simple outer lip. The columella is encrusted, smooth, with an anterior sulcus. The siphonal canal is moderately long and is curved to the left.

== Distribution ==
Fossils of this marine species were found in Neocene strata in California, USA.
