= Turris intercancellata =

Scientific classification
- Kingdom: Animalia
- Phylum: Mollusca
- Class: Gastropoda
- Subclass: Caenogastropoda
- Order: Neogastropoda
- Family: Turridae
- Genus: Turris
- Species: T. intercancellata

Binomial name
- Turris intercancellata Kilburn, Fedosov & B. M. Olivera, 2012

Species of gastropod

Turris intercancellata is a species of sea snail, a marine gastropod mollusk in the family Turridae, the turrids.

== Distribution ==
This marine species occurs off the Philippines.
