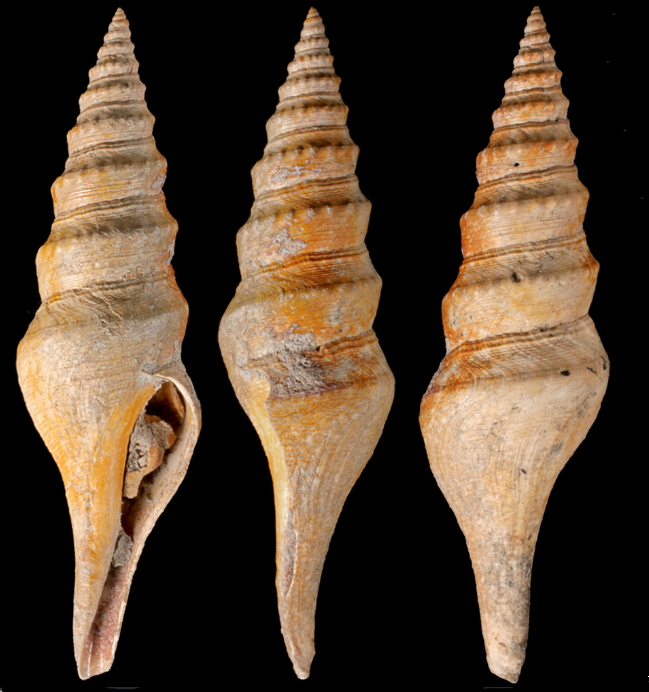
- Shell of Turris semipustulosa (holotype at MNHN, Paris)

Scientific classification
- Kingdom: Animalia
- Phylum: Mollusca
- Class: Gastropoda
- Subclass: Caenogastropoda
- Order: Neogastropoda
- Superfamily: Conoidea
- Family: Turridae
- Genus: Turris
- Species: T. semipustulosa

Binomial name
- Turris semipustulosa Lozouet, 2017

= Turris semipustulosa =

Species of gastropod

Turris semipustulosa is an extinct species of sea snail, a marine gastropod mollusk in the family Turridae, the turrids.

== Distribution ==
This extinct marine species was found in Oligocene strata in Aquitaine, France
