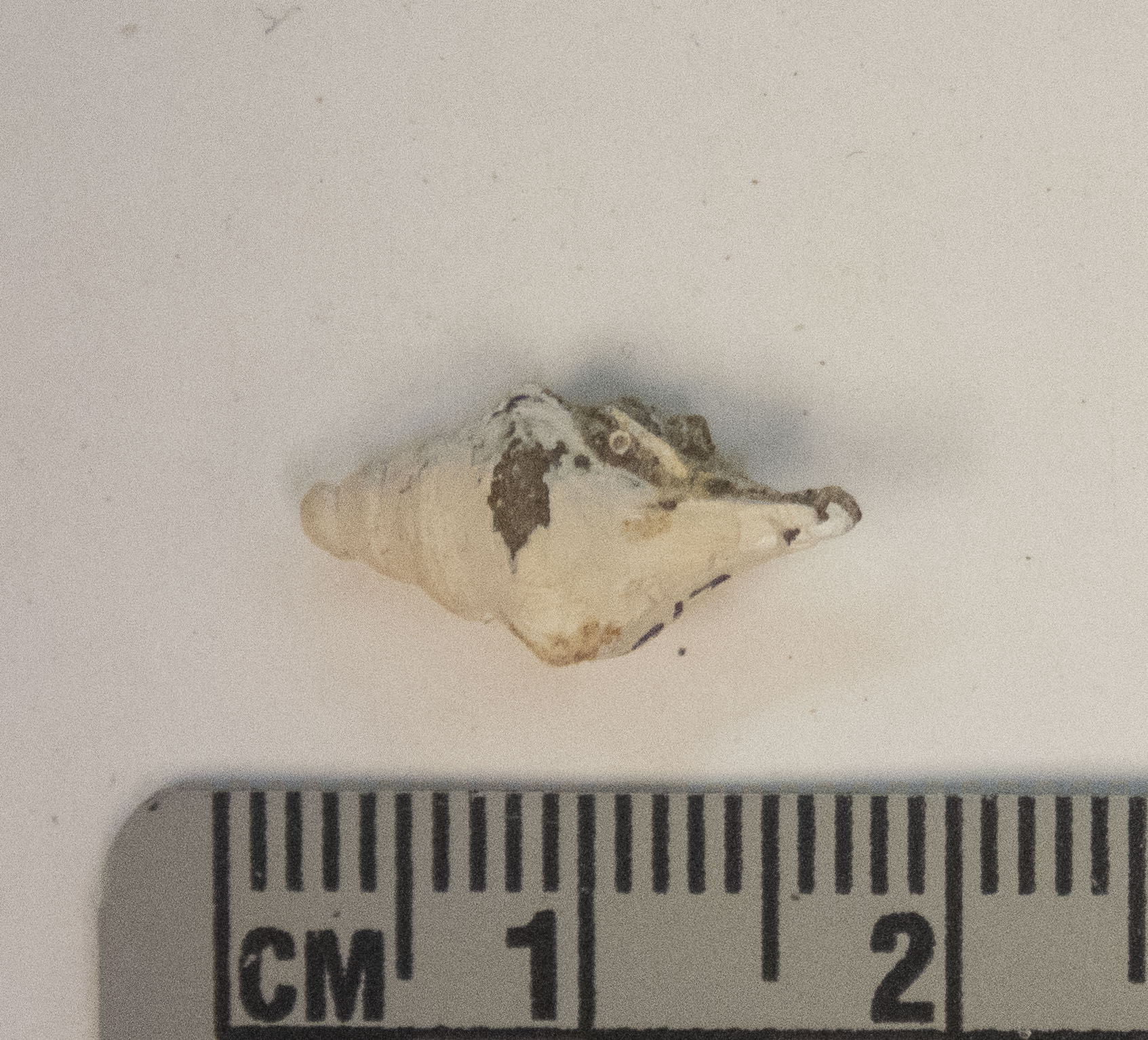

Scientific classification
- Kingdom: Animalia
- Phylum: Mollusca
- Class: Gastropoda
- Subclass: Caenogastropoda
- Order: Neogastropoda
- Superfamily: Conoidea
- Family: Turridae
- Genus: Turris
- Species: T. burroensis

Binomial name
- Turris burroensis R. N. Nelson 1925

= Turris burroensis =

Species of gastropod

Turris burroensis is an extinct species of sea snail, a marine gastropod mollusk in the family Turridae, the turrids.

== Taxonomy ==
Turris burroensis was described as a new species by the paleontologist Richard Newman Nelson in 1925, in his monograph "A contribution to the paleontology of the Martinez Eocene of California", published in the University of California Publications, Bulletin of the Department of Geological Sciences; the species was described on page 426 and figured on plate 57.

== Description ==
Measurements of the shell: 13.5 x 5.8 mm.

== Distribution ==
Fossils of this marine species were found in Eocene strata in California, USA.
