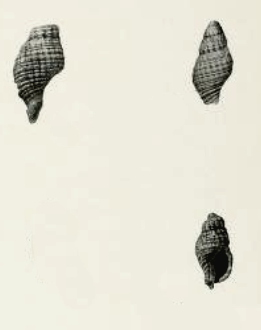
- Shell of Turris kirkensis (holotype)

Scientific classification
- Kingdom: Animalia
- Phylum: Mollusca
- Class: Gastropoda
- Subclass: Caenogastropoda
- Order: Neogastropoda
- Superfamily: Conoidea
- Family: Turridae
- Genus: Turris
- Species: T. kirkensis

Binomial name
- Turris kirkensis Clark 1915

= Turris kirkensis =

Species of gastropod

Turris kirkensis is an extinct species of sea snail, a marine gastropod mollusk in the family Turridae, the turrids.

== Description ==
The length of the shell attains 11 mm; the greatest diameter of the body whorl: 5 mm.

(Original description) The small shell has an elongate-ovate shape. It contains five or six whorls, which are regularly convex, with obscure appressed sutures and an acute apex.The surface of the shell is sculptured by coarse, nodose, revolving ribs, between which are finer and less nodose riblets. On each of the major ribs there are about twenty rounded nodes. The nodes of the different ribs are in line giving the shell the appearance of being longitudinally ribbed. The distribution of the revolving ribs and riblets is as follows: beginning at the suture on the body whorl there are two nodose indistinct ribs below which are two of the finer unnodose riblets, the anterior riblet being the heavier. Anterior to this are two nodose ribs with one fine indistinct unnodose riblet between. Between the last two nodose ribs just mentioned and the anterior end of the siphonal canal there are five of the major ribs between each of which excepting the last anterior two, there are two riblets, in each case the anterior of the riblets is heavier and shows a tendency to be nodose.

On some specimens toward the anterior end of the body whorl the heavier of the two riblets seen between each of the major ribs becomes as prominent as the major ribbing itself, the nodose character of the ribs disappearing. The whorls of spire show three of the heavier nodose revolving ribs. Anteriorly at the suture are two of the riblets, the heavier type of riblet being in front. Above these riblets are two of the nodose ribs which are very close together with a faint indication of an interrib between. Posteriorly this is again followed by two riblets the anterior one being the coarser. Above these is a nodose rib between which and the suture is one of the coarser riblets. Posterior sinus on specimens figured obscure. The outer lip is sharp. The inner lip is smooth and incrusted. The siphonal canal is short and straight. The umbilicus is subperforate.

== Distribution ==
Fossils of this marine species were found in California
