= Turris kaffraria =

Scientific classification
- Kingdom: Animalia
- Phylum: Mollusca
- Class: Gastropoda
- Subclass: Caenogastropoda
- Order: Neogastropoda
- Superfamily: Conoidea
- Family: Turridae
- Genus: Turris
- Species: T. kaffraria

Binomial name
- Turris kaffraria Woods 1906

Species of gastropod

Turris kaffraria is an extinct species of sea snail, a marine gastropod mollusk in the family Turridae, the turrids.

Owing to its columellar folds, the authors Steffen Kiel and Klaus Bandel state that it certainly does not belong in Turris.

== Distribution ==
Fossils of this marine species were found in Cretaceous strata in Cameroon (age range: 89.3 to 85.8 Ma)
