= Turris fernandoensis =

Scientific classification
- Kingdom: Animalia
- Phylum: Mollusca
- Class: Gastropoda
- Subclass: Caenogastropoda
- Order: Neogastropoda
- Superfamily: Conoidea
- Family: Turridae
- Genus: Turris
- Species: †T. fernandoensis

Binomial name
- †Turris fernandoensis English 1914

Species of gastropod

Turris fernandoensis is an extinct species of sea snail, a marine gastropod mollusk in the family Turridae, the turrids.

== Description ==
Average measurements of the shell: 21 x 9.0 mm.

(Original description) The small fusiform shell has a high spire, equal in height to the aperture. It contains five whorls, roundly angulated. The suture follows the line of angulation of preceding whorl. The posterior canal on upper slope of body whorl is prominent, wide, triangular with an angle of 135 between sides. The lower part of the body whorl and the siphonal canal are ornamented by faint spiral lines which may have been worn off of rest of whorl. The aperture is narrow. The outer lip is broken. The columella is simple;. The straight siphonal canal has a medium length.

== Distribution ==
Fossils of this marine species were found in Pliocene strata in California, USA (5.332 to 3.6 Ma).
