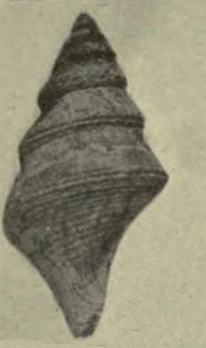
- Shell of Turris packardi (holotype)

Scientific classification
- Kingdom: Animalia
- Phylum: Mollusca
- Class: Gastropoda
- Subclass: Caenogastropoda
- Order: Neogastropoda
- Superfamily: Conoidea
- Family: Turridae
- Genus: Turris
- Species: T. packardi

Binomial name
- Turris packardi Weaver 1916

= Turris packardi =

Species of gastropod

Turris packardi is an extinct species of sea snail, a marine gastropod mollusk in the family Turridae, the turrids.

== Description ==
(Original description) The shell is small and fusiform. The spire is moderately elevated and about one and two-fifths as long as the siphonal canal; The shell contains eight, very angular whorls. A well developed keel is present upon the angulated area of each whorl. The surface of each whorl above the angle is very slightly concave and ornamented by very faint revolving lines. The middle portion of each whorl has two very prominent revolving cord-like ribs with very narrow groove like interspaces. The anterior surface of the body whorl is sculptured with 13 revolving ribs which are less well defined than those upon the middle portion. The interspaces on the lower portion are very narrow. The lines of growth are quite prominent and conforming to the outline of the posterior sinus. The suture is distinct. The aperture is sub-pyriform. The siphonal canal has a moderate length and is deeply channeled.

== Distribution ==
Fossils of this marine species were found in Oligocene strata in Washington, USA
