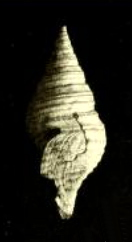
- Shell of Turris selwyni (holotype)

Scientific classification
- Kingdom: Animalia
- Phylum: Mollusca
- Class: Gastropoda
- Subclass: Caenogastropoda
- Order: Neogastropoda
- Superfamily: Conoidea
- Family: Turridae
- Genus: Turris
- Species: T. selwyni

Binomial name
- Turris selwyni (Pritchard, 1904)

Synonyms
- † Epideira selwyni (Pritchard, 1904); † Epideira selwyni suppressa Finlay, 1927; † Pleurotoma selwyni Pritchard, 1904; † Pleurotoma selwyni var. laevis Pritchard, 1904 (invalid, not Hutton, 1873)

= Turris selwyni =

Species of gastropod

Turris selwyni is an extinct species of sea snail, a marine gastropod mollusk in the family Turridae, the turrids.

== Description ==
The length of the shell varies between 28 mm and 38 mm.

(Original description) The shell has a tumidly fusiform or biconic shape. It is of medium size and build, with a comparatively broad body whorl rapidly tapering to a very acute spire, with an aperture only slightly less than half the length of the shell, and a well-marked sinus on the keel. The protoconch is small, smooth, with an obtuse nucleus composed of about two whorls gradually merging into the whorls of the spire. The spire contains eight whorls, with a somewhat irregular and ascending overlap, giving rise to a canaliculate suture. The whorls are convex and furnished medially with two spiral lirae which mark exactly the position of the sinus. A third spiral thread is usually visible just above the anterior suture, and a fourth weak one just below the posterior suture on the earlier spire whorls, while a fifth makes its appearance on the penultimate and antepenultimate whorls and the posterior sutural thread becomes stronger. On the body whorl below the sinus threads there are eight or nine stronger spiral lirae, and the space between the suture and the keel is strongly concave. The whole shell surface is finely spirally striate, the striae tending to be slightly undulatory owing to irregularities of growth, and increasing in strength towards the anterior of the shell. The spiral sculpture is crossed transversely by sinuated growth lines and striae of unequal strength. The sinus is broad and deep, and distinctly margined by the lirae forming the keel. The aperture is large, pyriform, and extending- to a short, broad, open, slightly bent siphonal canal. The outer lip is thin and strongly arched at the middle, crenulate internally in conformity with the stronger spiral threads. The columella margin is smooth and slightly enamelled.

== Distribution ==
Fossils of this marine species were found in Miocene strata in Victoria, Australia.
