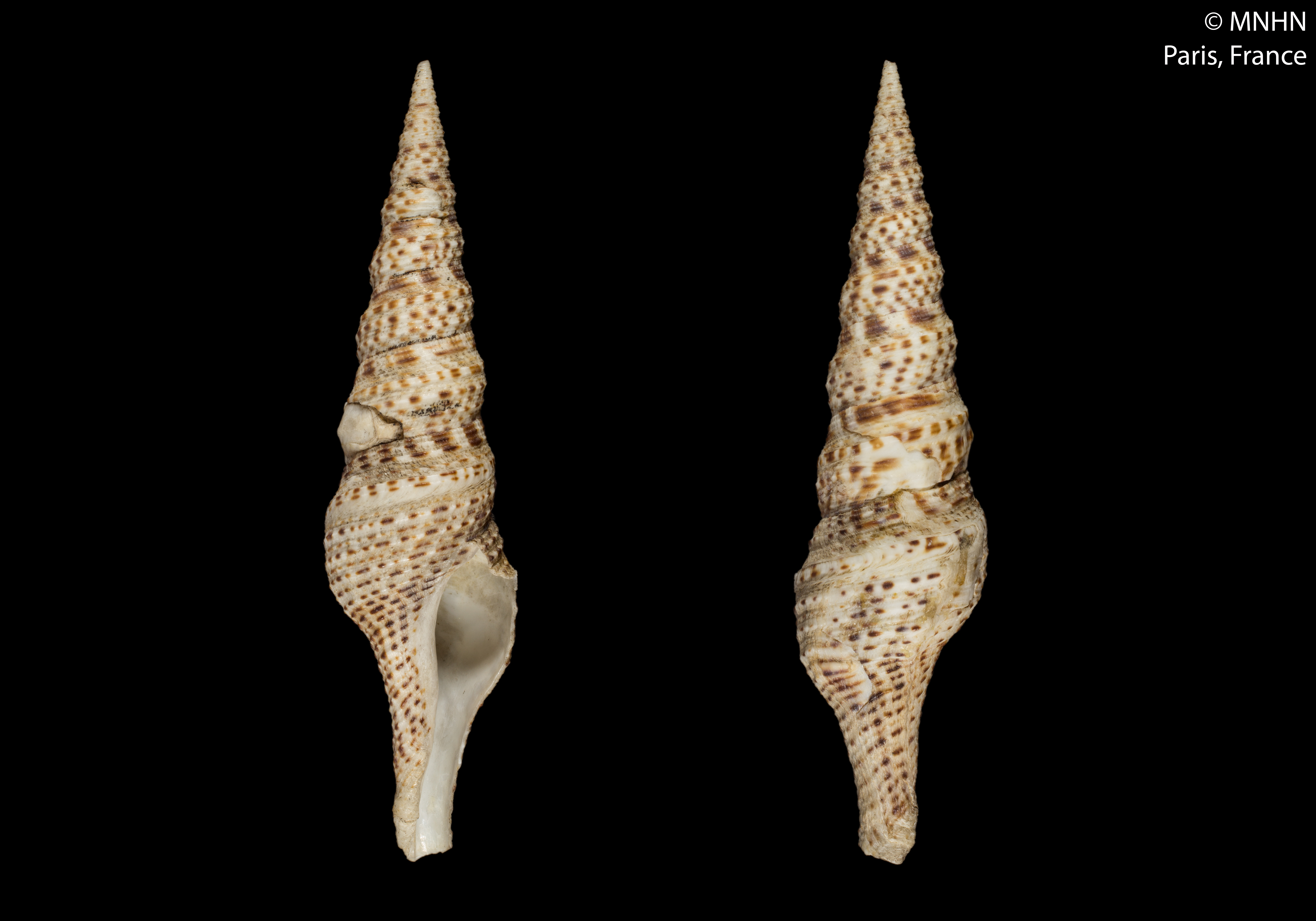
- Shell of Turris yeddoensis (syntype at MNHN, Paris)

Scientific classification
- Kingdom: Animalia
- Phylum: Mollusca
- Class: Gastropoda
- Subclass: Caenogastropoda
- Order: Neogastropoda
- Superfamily: Conoidea
- Family: Turridae
- Genus: Turris
- Species: T. yeddoensis

Binomial name
- Turris yeddoensis (Jousseaume, 1883)

Synonyms
- Pleurotoma yeddoensis Jousseaume, 1883; Turris crispa yeddoensis (F.P. Jousseaume, 1883)

= Turris yeddoensis =

Species of gastropod

Turris yeddoensis, common name the comely pleurotoma, is a species of sea snail, a marine gastropod mollusk in the family Turridae, the turrids.

== Description ==
The length of the shell attains 90 mm, its diameter 20 mm.

(Original description in French) The shell is turreted and spindle-shaped, fairly thick and sturdy, encircled by spiral ribs and decorated with brownish spots standing out against a yellowish-white background. The spire, of which the first two or three whorls are missing from the specimen we have studied, is composed of about fifteen rounded whorls that increase slowly and regularly in size and are separated by a clearly defined suture.

On the early whorls rise five circular ribs. The first two, situated in front of the suture, are adorned with rather widely spaced dark brown markings. The following three, set farther apart and separated from the preceding pair by a somewhat broader and lighter-colored interval, are stronger and mottled with very closely packed small brownish dots. These ribs are divided by fairly broad grooves, at the bottom of which a magnifying glass reveals three small intermediate threadlike ridges, the middle one, always more pronounced, being visible to the naked eye.

Small, tightly packed overlapping scales, more noticeable in the grooves than on the sides, give the shell a roughened appearance over its entire surface. On the body whorl the ribs become much more numerous and continue to the end of the siphonal canal. The rib corresponding to the canal notch is separated from the preceding ones by a broader, almost uniformly colored, ribbon-like space. The threadlike ridge found in the intermediate spaces, strong and very conspicuous, is spotted like the principal ribs, though with much smaller and slightly paler brown dots.

At the base of the body whorl and at the origin of the siphonal canal, the shell takes on a strongly marked brown coloration, especially in specimens that have not yet reached full maturity.

The aperture, shaped like an elongated oval, ends anteriorly in a broad and deep groove, while posteriorly it narrows into a deep canal that extends inward along the contour of the suture. The columellar lip, fairly broad and slightly undulating, is smooth and porcelain white, as the animal has eroded the shell surface in this area, except near the suture where a thickened ridge has formed from a deposit of callus.

The outer lip, thin and sharp-edged, is notched in its posterior quarter by a very deep slit. The siphonal canal, very broad and slightly upturned, measures approximately one quarter of the shell’s total length.

== Distribution ==
This marine species occurs off Japan.
