= Turris ambages =

Scientific classification
- Kingdom: Animalia
- Phylum: Mollusca
- Class: Gastropoda
- Subclass: Caenogastropoda
- Order: Neogastropoda
- Family: Turridae
- Genus: Turris
- Species: T. ambages

Binomial name
- Turris ambages Barnard, 1958

Species of gastropod

Turris ambages is a species of sea snail, a marine gastropod mollusk in the family Turridae, the turrids.

== Description ==
The length of the shell varies between 20 mm and 31 mm.

== Distribution ==
This marine species occurs off KwaZulu-Natal (South Africa), Mozambique and the Philippines.
