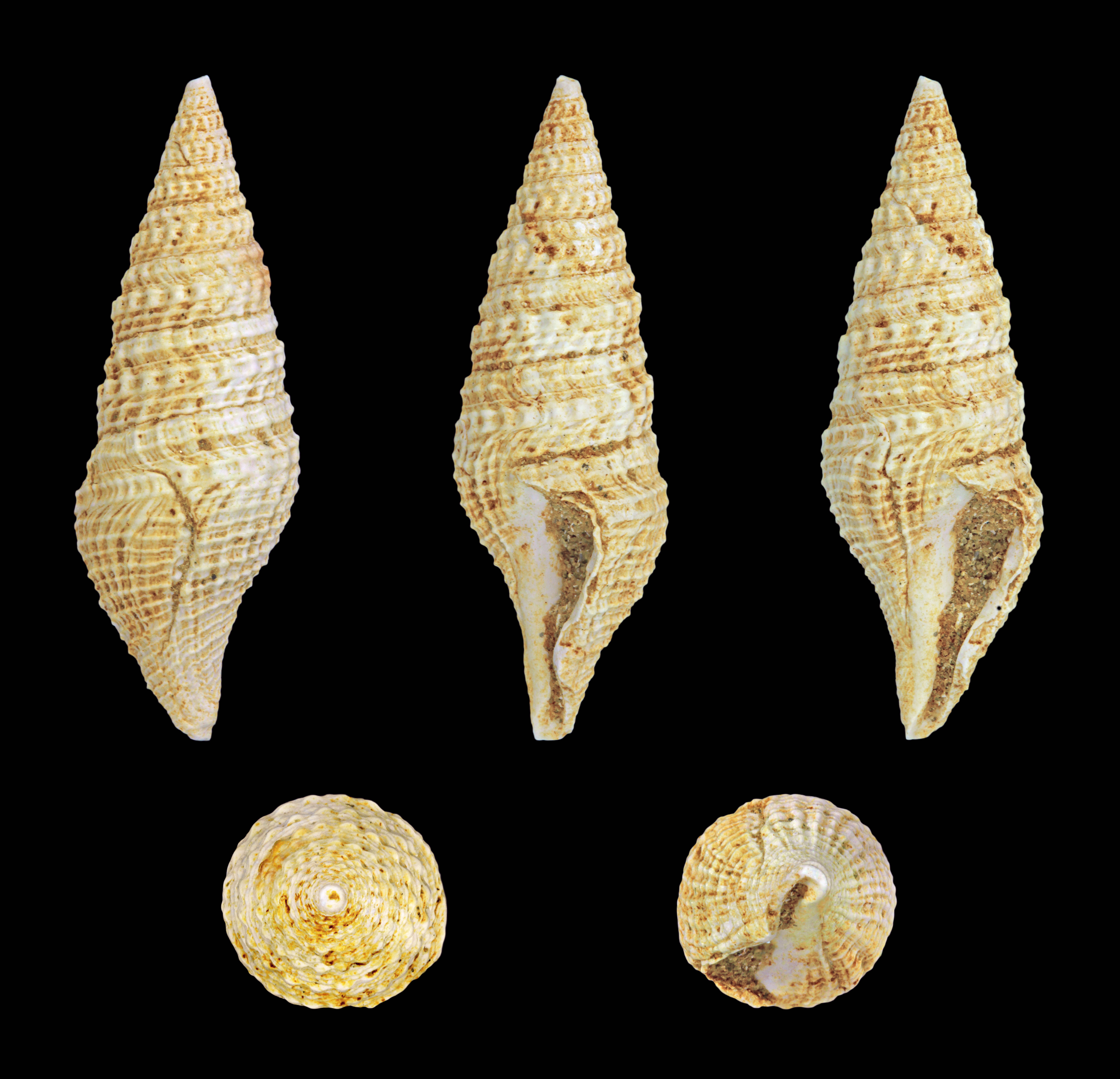
- Shell of Turris canaliculata

Scientific classification
- Kingdom: Animalia
- Phylum: Mollusca
- Class: Gastropoda
- Subclass: Caenogastropoda
- Order: Neogastropoda
- Superfamily: Conoidea
- Family: Turridae
- Genus: Turris
- Species: T. canaliculata

Binomial name
- Turris canaliculata É.A. Benoist, 1873

= Turris canaliculata =

Species of gastropod

Turris canaliculata is an extinct species of sea snail, a marine gastropod mollusk in the family Turridae, the turrids.

== Description ==
Measurenements of the shell: between 25 mm and 27 mm.

== Distribution ==
Fossils of this marine species were found in Miocene strata in Aquitaine, France..
