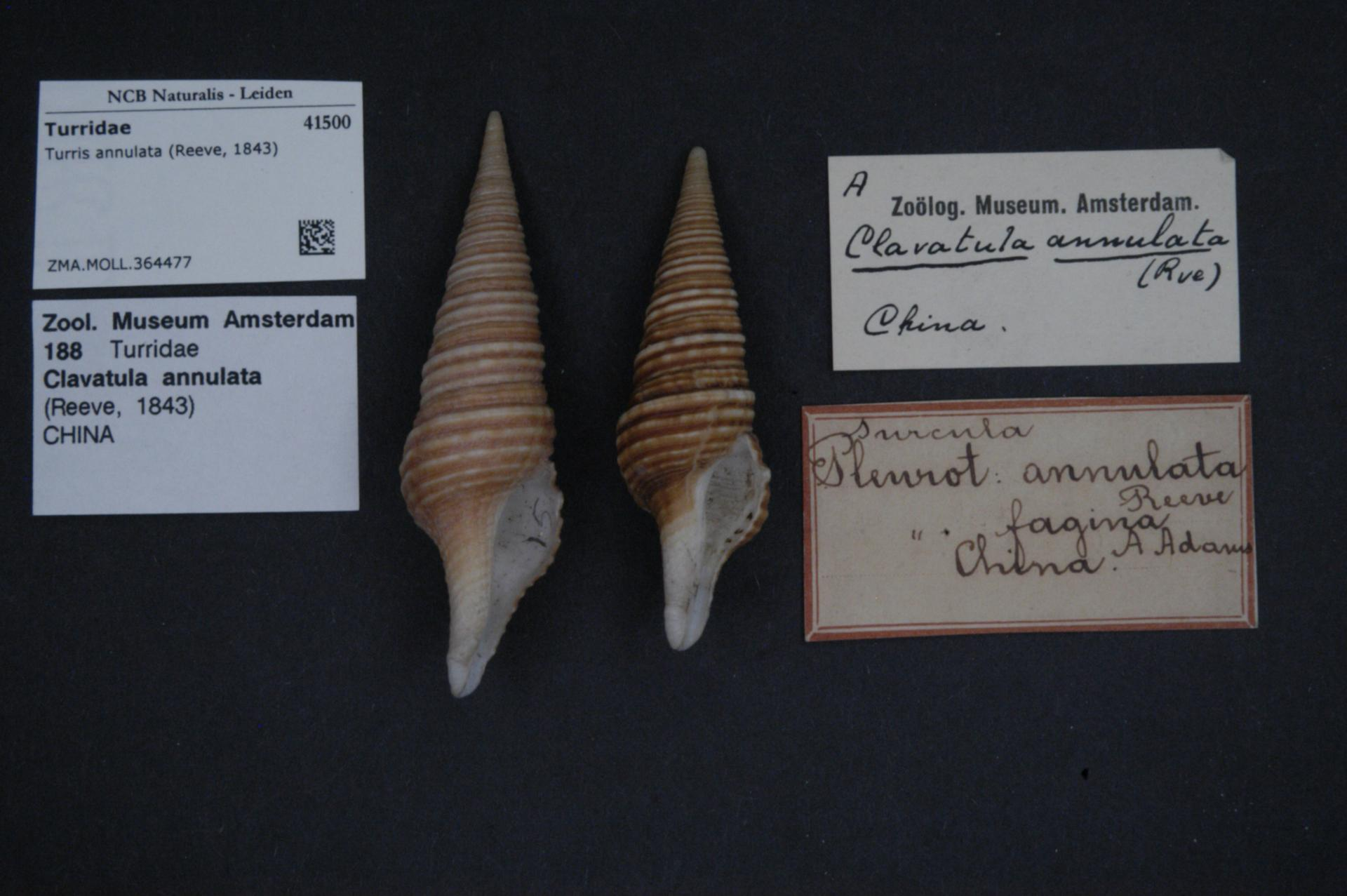
- Shell of Turris annulata (specimen at Naturalis Biodiversity Center)

Scientific classification
- Kingdom: Animalia
- Phylum: Mollusca
- Class: Gastropoda
- Subclass: Caenogastropoda
- Order: Neogastropoda
- Superfamily: Conoidea
- Family: Turridae
- Genus: Turris
- Species: T. annulata

Binomial name
- Turris annulata (Reeve, 1843)

Synonyms
- Pleurotoma annulata Reeve, 1843; Pleurotoma fagina A. Adams & Reeve, 1850; Polystira fagina A. Adams & L.A. Reeve, 1850·

= Turris annulata =

Species of gastropod

Turris annulata, common name the ringed pleurotoma, is a species of sea snail, a marine gastropod mollusk in the family Turridae, the turrids.

== Description ==
The length of the shell attains 59 mm.

(Original description) The brow, solid shell is subulate. The whorls are slightly convex, encircled with a number of smooth, paler ridges, like rings. The siphonal canal is rather long.

== Distribution ==
This marine species occurs off the Philippines, India, Thailand; in the East China Sea and the Sea of Japan.
