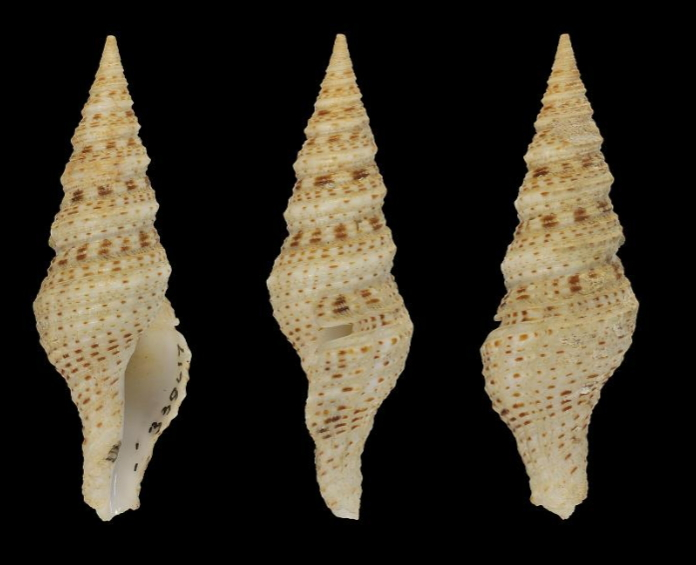
- Shell of Turris intricata

Scientific classification
- Kingdom: Animalia
- Phylum: Mollusca
- Class: Gastropoda
- Subclass: Caenogastropoda
- Order: Neogastropoda
- Superfamily: Conoidea
- Family: Turridae
- Genus: Turris
- Species: T. intricata

Binomial name
- Turris intricata Powell, 1964

Synonyms
- Turris crispa intricata Powell, 1964 (original combination)

= Turris intricata =

Species of gastropod

Turris intricata is a species of sea snail, a marine gastropod mollusk in the family Turridae, the turrids.

== Description ==
The length of the shell attains 34 mm.

== Distribution ==
This marine species occurs off the Hawaii.
