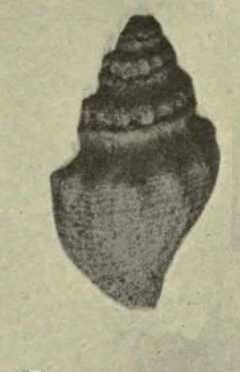
- Shell of Turris wynoocheensis (holotype)

Scientific classification
- Kingdom: Animalia
- Phylum: Mollusca
- Class: Gastropoda
- Subclass: Caenogastropoda
- Order: Neogastropoda
- Superfamily: Conoidea
- Family: Turridae
- Genus: Turris
- Species: T. wynoocheensis

Binomial name
- Turris wynoocheensis Weaver 1916

= Turris wynoocheensis =

Species of gastropod

Turris wynoocheensis is an extinct species of sea snail, a marine gastropod mollusk in the family Turridae, the turrids.

== Description ==
The length of the shell attains 23 mm, the spire 11 mm. The maximum diameter of the shell is 8 mm.

(Original description) The small and solid shell contains five and one-half whorls, each of which is sharply angulated. The spire has about same length as the body of whorl. The body whorl is sculptured with nine distinct revolving ribs below the angle and within the interspaces there is a fine revolving thread. Between the last upper revolving rib and the angulated portion of the whorl there are five closely set very inconspicuous revolving threads . Between the angle and suture there are ten similar lines. This ornamentation is crossed by numerous closely set lines of growth which conform to the slightly developed posterior sinus. On the angle of each whorl there are thirteen prominent nodes which disappear above and below. The aperture is moderately wide. The outer lip is sharp. The inner lip is slightly callused. The siphonal canal is slightly extended with a well defined sinus at the end. The upper margin of each whorl is developed into a collar which partly covers the suture. The angle of the body whorl is very close to the suture.

== Distribution ==
Fossils of this marine species were found in Oligocene strata in Washington, USA.
