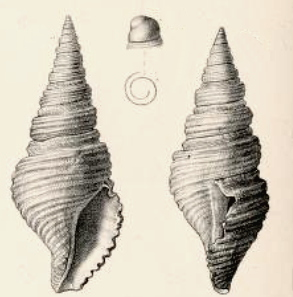
- Shell of Turris septemlirata (holotype)

Scientific classification
- Kingdom: Animalia
- Phylum: Mollusca
- Class: Gastropoda
- Subclass: Caenogastropoda
- Order: Neogastropoda
- Superfamily: Conoidea
- Family: Turridae
- Genus: Turris
- Species: T. septemlirata

Binomial name
- Turris septemlirata (G.F. Harris, 1897)

Synonyms
- † Pleurotoma perarata Cossmann, 1896; † Pleurotoma septemlirata G.F. Harris, 1897

= Turris septemlirata =

Species of gastropod

Turris septemlirata is an extinct species of sea snail, a marine gastropod mollusk in the family Turridae, the turrids.

== Description ==
The length of the shell varies between 50 mm and 60 mm.

(Original description) The large shell is fusiform and tumid. The protoconch is small, smooth, devoid of ornament, terminating abruptly at its junction with the shell in the brephic stage. The shell contains eleven whorls. The suture is canaliculate and bimarginate, rugosely spirally lirate. There are seven principal spirally striated lirae on the penultimate whorl in the adult, but at younger stages of growth they are fewer in number, decreasing gradually to four. The body whorl is irregularly Urate throughout. Between the large compound liration on the margin of the suture anteriorly, and the elevated ridge denoting the position of the sinus, is a broad, deep sulcation, which, like the sulci between the lirae, is finely spirally striated and interrupted by lines of growth. The aperture is large, broad, ovate and contracted anteriorly. The outer lip is thin, sulcate within, crenulated or serrated, arcuate . The sinus is broad and deep and is situated distantly from the suture. The columellar margin is smooth, curved, slightly callous in senile individuals. The siphonal canal is very short and broad.

== Distribution ==
Fossils of this marine species were found in Miocene strata in Victoria, Australia.
