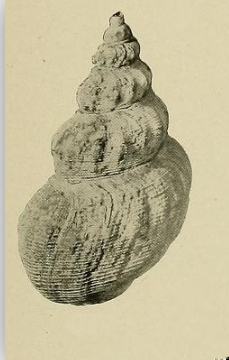
- Shell of † Turris lincolnensis (holotype)

Scientific classification
- Kingdom: Animalia
- Phylum: Mollusca
- Class: Gastropoda
- Subclass: Caenogastropoda
- Order: Neogastropoda
- Superfamily: Conoidea
- Family: Turridae
- Genus: Turris
- Species: T. lincolnensis

Binomial name
- Turris lincolnensis Winkle 1918

= Turris lincolnensis =

Species of gastropod

Turris lincolnensis is an extinct species of sea snail, a marine gastropod mollusk in the family Turridae, the turrids.

== Description ==
The height of the figured specimen (apex and siphonal canal defective) is 43 mm. The width of the body whorl is 24 mm.

(Original description) The large, fusiform shell contains seven or eight whorls.The spire is high, with an acute apex. The whorls of the spire are obtusely angulated a little anterior to the middle, nearly flat above and below, slightly concave near the suture. The sculpture consists of prominent nodes and fine spiral threads separated by wider interspaces carrying fine intercalary lines, fifteen nodes and about twenty-four major spiral threads on the penultimate whorl. The suture is distinct and appressed. The body whorl is ventricose, ornamented with a row of nodes a little above the middle producing a slight angular appearance, convex above and below, constricted at the suture. The spiral sculpture similar to that of the whorls of the spire. The aperture is oval, with a broad and shallow posterior sinus. The siphonal canal is moderately long.

== Distribution ==
Fossils of this marine species were found in Miocene strata in Oregon, USA.
