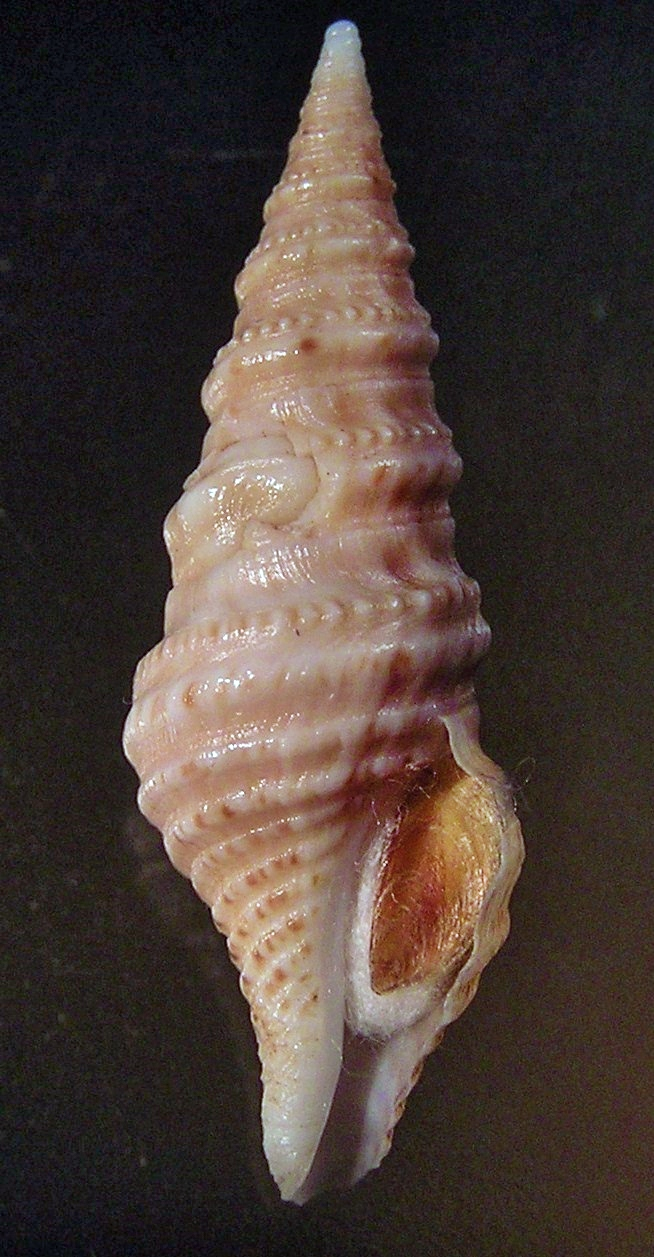

Scientific classification
- Kingdom: Animalia
- Phylum: Mollusca
- Class: Gastropoda
- Subclass: Caenogastropoda
- Order: Neogastropoda
- Family: Turridae
- Genus: Turris
- Species: T. ruthae

Binomial name
- Turris ruthae Kilburn, 1983

= Turris ruthae =

Species of gastropod

Turris ruthae is a species of sea snail, a marine gastropod mollusk in the family Turridae, the turrids.

== Description ==
The length of this species varies between 38 mm and 57 mm.

== Distribution ==
This marine species occurs off Natal, South Africa.

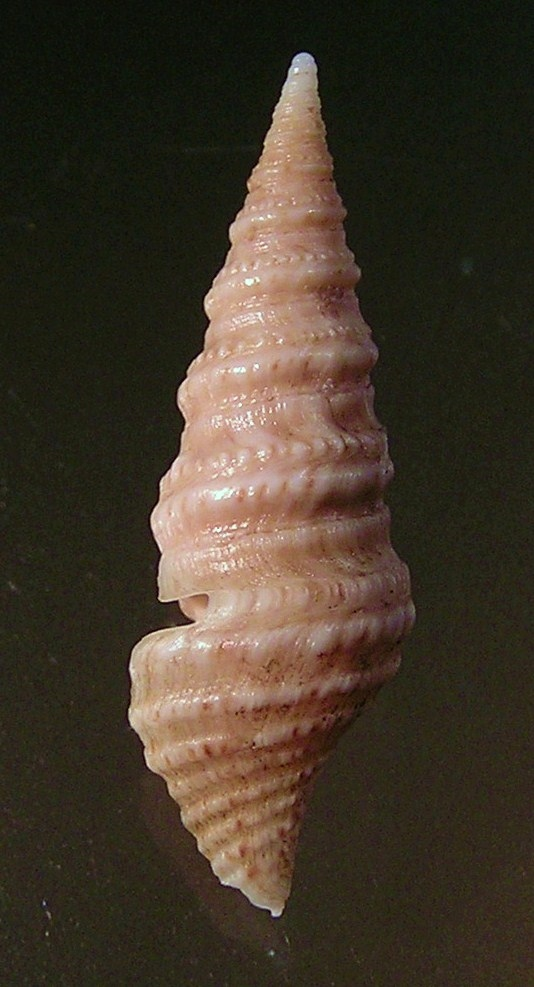
Turris ruthae
