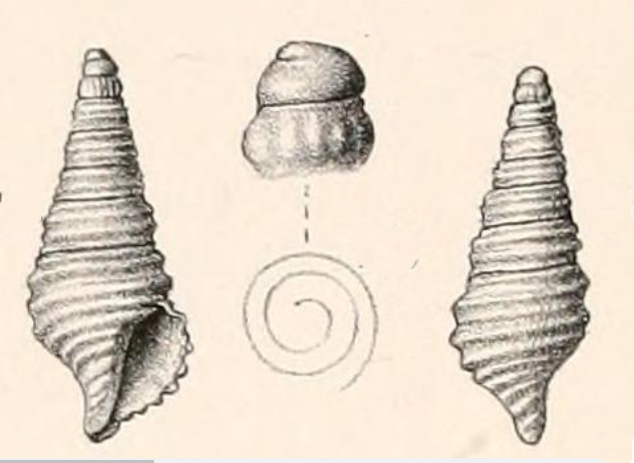
- Shell of Turris trilirata (holotype)

Scientific classification
- Kingdom: Animalia
- Phylum: Mollusca
- Class: Gastropoda
- Subclass: Caenogastropoda
- Order: Neogastropoda
- Superfamily: Conoidea
- Family: Turridae
- Genus: Turris
- Species: T. trilirata

Binomial name
- Turris trilirata (G.F. Harris, 1897)

Synonyms
- † Pleurotoma trilirata G.F. Harris, 1879 (original combination)

= Turris trilirata =

Species of gastropod

Turris trilirata is an extinct species of sea snail, a marine gastropod mollusk in the family Turridae, the turrids.

== Description ==
Dimensions: length 10.5 mm; breadth 4 mm; length of the aperture 3-5 mm.

Original description:

The small shell is elongate. The protoconch is large and is composed of 2½ smooth whorls. The earlier portion is much depressed, and even in the initial part the suture is canaliculate and marginate. At a later stage the protoconch is longitudinally costate and subnodose at the periphery, and this continues up to the brephic stage, where it gives way to the bold spiral lirae which form the sole ornamentation of the whorls in subsequent stages of growth. The shell contains six flat whorls. The suture is canaliculate and marginate. There are three spiral lirae on the penultimate whorl, with a smaller lineation between the posterior two, which becomes more accentuated on the body whorl. The latter is boldly lirated throughout. Lines of growth are inconspicuous. The aperture is small and pyriform. The outer lip is arcuate. The sinus is shallo and is situated not far from the suture. The columellar margin is smooth, not callous and slightly twisted in front. The anterior canal is very short.

The most interesting feature of this species is the highly sculptured protoconch, which differs from that of any other Australian form here described. The longitudinal ribs, however, precede the spiral lirae as in some other species of this genus.

== Distribution ==
Fossils of this extinct species were found in Eocene strata in Victoria, Australia.
