= Turris gilchristi =

Scientific classification
- Kingdom: Animalia
- Phylum: Mollusca
- Class: Gastropoda
- Subclass: Caenogastropoda
- Order: Neogastropoda
- Superfamily: Conoidea
- Family: Turridae
- Genus: Turris
- Species: †T. gilchristi

Binomial name
- †Turris gilchristi Dey 1961

Species of gastropod

Turris gilchristi is an extinct species of sea snail, a marine gastropod mollusk in the family Turridae, the turrids.

== Distribution ==
Fossils of this marine species were found in Miocene strata in Kerala, India (age range:23.03 to 15.97 Ma)
