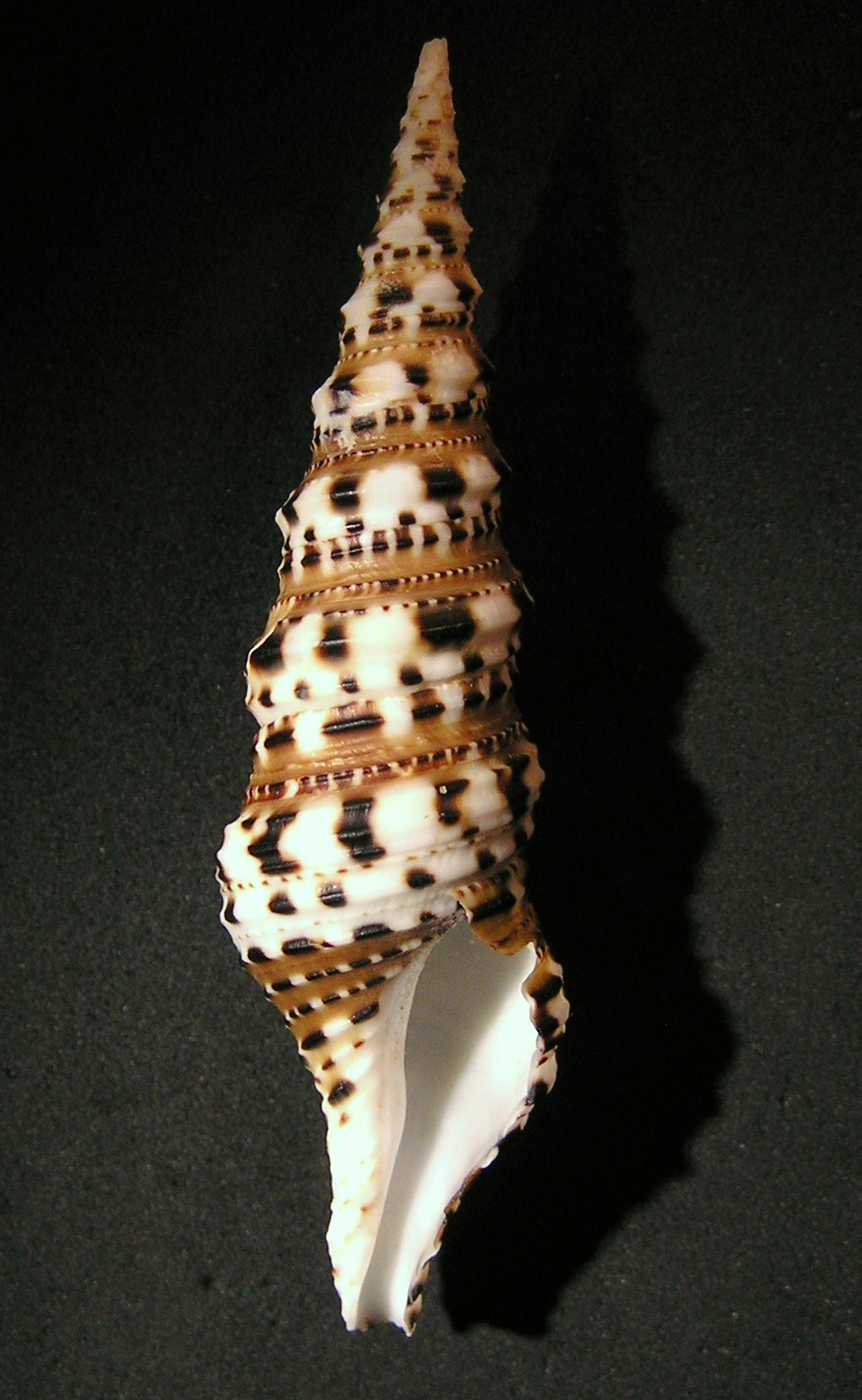
- Apertural view of Turris hidalgoi

Scientific classification
- Kingdom: Animalia
- Phylum: Mollusca
- Class: Gastropoda
- Subclass: Caenogastropoda
- Order: Neogastropoda
- Family: Turridae
- Genus: Turris
- Species: T. hidalgoi

Binomial name
- Turris hidalgoi Vera-Pelaez et al., 2000

Synonyms
- Turris totiphyllis Olivera, 2000 (declared junior synonym of T. hidalgo by First Reviser's choice by Kilburn et al. 2012)

= Turris hidalgoi =

Species of gastropod

Turris hidalgoi is a species of sea snail, a marine gastropod mollusk in the family Turridae, the turrids.

== Description ==
The length of the fusiform shell attains 70 mm.

== Distribution ==
This marine species occurs off the coast of the Philippines.

== Bibliography ==
- Vera-Pelaez, J. L., Vega-Luz, R. & Lozano-Francisco, M. C. (2000). Five new species of the genus Turris Roding, 1798 (Gastropoda; Turridae; Turrinae) of the Philippines and one new species of the southern Indo-Pacific. Malakos [Revista de la Asociacióon Malacolóogica Andaluza]. Monografia 2, 1-29.
- Kilburn R.N., Fedosov A.E. & Olivera B.M. (2012) Revision of the genus Turris Batsch, 1789 (Gastropoda: Conoidea: Turridae) with the description of six new species. Zootaxa 3244: 1-58.
