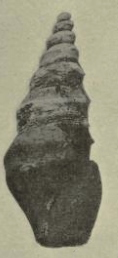
- Shell of Turris clallamensis (holotype)

Scientific classification
- Kingdom: Animalia
- Phylum: Mollusca
- Class: Gastropoda
- Subclass: Caenogastropoda
- Order: Neogastropoda
- Superfamily: Conoidea
- Family: Turridae
- Genus: Turris
- Species: T. clallamensis

Binomial name
- Turris clallamensis Weaver 1916

Synonyms
- † Aforia clallamensis J. W. Durham 1944

= Turris clallamensis =

Species of gastropod

Turris clallamensis is an extinct species of sea snail, a marine gastropod mollusk in the family Turridae, the turrids.

== Description ==
The length of the shell attains 85 mm, the spire 38 mm.; the maximum diameter of shell is 28 mm.

(Original description) The large and solid shell contains nine or ten whorls which are moderately inflated. Eeach whorl is sharply angulated by well-defined carinae at or just a little below the central portions. Immediately below the posterior carina or angle a second less well developed angle is present which is more conspicuous on the body whorl and less well upon the whorls of the spire. The surface of the whorls above the angle is slightly concave. The suture is distinct. The surface of the whorls below angles is ornamented by sixteen revolving ribs which are crossed by numerous closely set longitudinal lines of growth. The aperture is very narrow. The inner lip is smooth and callused. The outer lip smooth. The siphonal canal is elongate and straight.

== Distribution ==
Fossils of this marine species were found in Oligocene strata in Washington and Miocene strata in Oregon, USA. (Age range: 28.4 to 13.65 Ma)
