= Turris cleopatrae =

Scientific classification
- Kingdom: Animalia
- Phylum: Mollusca
- Class: Gastropoda
- Subclass: Caenogastropoda
- Order: Neogastropoda
- Superfamily: Conoidea
- Family: Turridae
- Genus: Turris
- Species: T. cleopatrae

Binomial name
- Turris cleopatrae Abbass 1967

Species of gastropod

Turris cleopatrae is an extinct species of sea snail, a marine gastropod mollusk in the family Turridae.

== Description ==
Measurements of the shell: 10.0 x 4.0 mm.

== Distribution ==
This extinct marine species was found in Eocene strata in Egypt (40.4 to 37.2 Ma).
