= Turris higoensis =

Scientific classification
- Kingdom: Animalia
- Phylum: Mollusca
- Class: Gastropoda
- Subclass: Caenogastropoda
- Order: Neogastropoda
- Superfamily: Conoidea
- Family: Turridae
- Genus: Turris
- Species: †T. higoensis

Binomial name
- †Turris higoensis Nagao 1928

Species of gastropod

Turris higoensis is an extinct species of sea snail, a marine gastropod mollusk in the family Turridae, the turrids.

== Distribution ==
Fossils of this marine species were found in Paleogene strata in Kyushu, Japan (age range:48.6 to 40.4 Maa)
