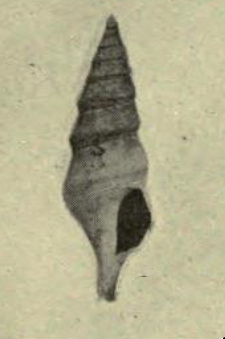
- Shell of Turris dickersoni (holotype)

Scientific classification
- Kingdom: Animalia
- Phylum: Mollusca
- Class: Gastropoda
- Subclass: Caenogastropoda
- Order: Neogastropoda
- Superfamily: Conoidea
- Family: Turridae
- Genus: Turris
- Species: T. dickersoni

Binomial name
- Turris dickersoni C.E. Weaver 1916

Synonyms
- † Parasyrinx dickersoni C.E. Weaver, 1916; † Spirotropis dickersoni C.E. Weaver, 1916

= Turris dickersoni =

Species of gastropod

Turris dickersoni is an extinct species of sea snail, a marine gastropod mollusk in the family Turridae, the turrids.

== Description ==
(Original description) The shell is small and elongate. It contains 10 angular whorls. The spire is elevated and conical. The upper surface of the whorls is concave and ornamented by very faintly developed revolving ribs. A prominent keel is developed upon the angulated portion of each whorl and this is sculptured by three rounded ribs with interspaces of equal width. About thirty similar ribs are present on the lower surface of the body whorl. The longitudinal sculpture is represented by moderately developed lines of growth which conform to the posterior sinus. The aperture is subpyriform. The outer lip is thin. The inner lip is callused with a noticeable groove separating the callus from the ornamented portion of the whorl. The siphonal canal is of moderate length, deeply channeled and nearly straight.

== Distribution ==
Fossils of this marine species were found in Oligocene strata in Washington, USA
