= Turris perarata =

Scientific classification
- Kingdom: Animalia
- Phylum: Mollusca
- Class: Gastropoda
- Subclass: Caenogastropoda
- Order: Neogastropoda
- Superfamily: Conoidea
- Family: Turridae
- Genus: Turris
- Species: T. perarata

Binomial name
- Turris perarata (Tate in Cossmann, 1896)

Synonyms
- Pleurotoma perarata Tate in Cossmann, 1896

Species of gastropod

Turris perarata is an extinct species of sea snail, a marine gastropod mollusk in the family Turridae, the turrids.

== Distribution ==
This extinct marine species was found in Eocene strata in Australia
