= Turris venusta =

Scientific classification
- Kingdom: Animalia
- Phylum: Mollusca
- Class: Gastropoda
- Subclass: Caenogastropoda
- Order: Neogastropoda
- Superfamily: Conoidea
- Family: Turridae
- Genus: Turris
- Species: T. venusta

Binomial name
- Turris venusta (Reeve, 1843)

Synonyms
- Pleurotoma venusta Reeve, 1843

Species of gastropod

Turris venusta, common name the comely pleurotoma, is a species of sea snail, a marine gastropod mollusk in the family Turridae, the turrids.

== Description ==
The length of the shell varies between 49 mm and 109 mm.

(Original description) The shell has a stoutly fusiform shape. It is yellowish and spotted with dark brown. The whorls are rounded and transversely many-ribbed, obliquely spotted. The upper part is depressed, vividly painted with larger spots . The siphonal canal is long.

== Distribution ==
This marine species occurs off the Philippines.
