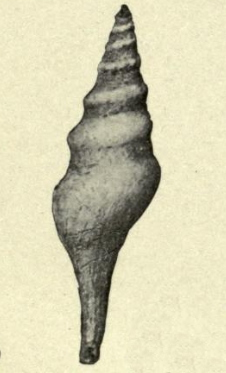
- Shell of Turris louderbacki (holotype)

Scientific classification
- Kingdom: Animalia
- Phylum: Mollusca
- Class: Gastropoda
- Subclass: Caenogastropoda
- Order: Neogastropoda
- Superfamily: Conoidea
- Family: Turridae
- Genus: Turris
- Species: T. louderbacki

Binomial name
- Turris louderbacki Dickerson 1914

= Turris louderbacki =

Species of gastropod

Turris louderbacki is an extinct species of sea snail, a marine gastropod mollusk in the family Turridae, the turrids.

== Description ==
The length of the shell attains 35 mm; the maximum diameter is 13 mm.

(Original description) The fusiform shell has a high spire which is nearly equal in length to the body whorl. It contains eight whorls marked by twelve rounded nodes. The slightly concave space above the shoulder of the whorl slopes steeply from the impressed linear suture. In the whorls of the spire this space is twice as long as the nodose convex space below the angle. Fine rounded spiral lines decorate the whorls. Growth lines indicate a sinus at angle. The outer lip is simple. The inner lip is incrusted The siphonal canal is long and straight.

== Distribution ==
Fossils of this marine species were found in Eocene strata in California, USA (age range: 61.7 to 58.7 Ma)
