= Turris elsmerensis =

Scientific classification
- Kingdom: Animalia
- Phylum: Mollusca
- Class: Gastropoda
- Subclass: Caenogastropoda
- Order: Neogastropoda
- Superfamily: Conoidea
- Family: Turridae
- Genus: Turris
- Species: †T. elsmerensis

Binomial name
- †Turris elsmerensis English 1914

Species of gastropod

Turris elsmerensis is an extinct species of sea snail, a marine gastropod mollusk in the family Turridae, the turrids.

== Description ==
Average measurements of the shell: 29.0 x 11.0 mm.

== Distribution ==
Fossils of this marine species were found in Pliocene strata in California, USA (age range: 5.332 to 3.6 Ma).
