= Turris multigyrata =

Scientific classification
- Kingdom: Animalia
- Phylum: Mollusca
- Class: Gastropoda
- Subclass: Caenogastropoda
- Order: Neogastropoda
- Superfamily: Conoidea
- Family: Turridae
- Genus: Turris
- Species: T. multigyrata

Binomial name
- Turris multigyrata (Cossmann 1906)

Synonyms
- Pleurotoma multigyrata Cossmann 1906 (original combination)

Species of gastropod

Turris multigyrata is an extinct species of sea snail, a marine gastropod mollusk in the family Turridae, the turrids.

== Distribution ==
Fossils of this marine species were found in Eocene strata in the Paris Basin, France.
