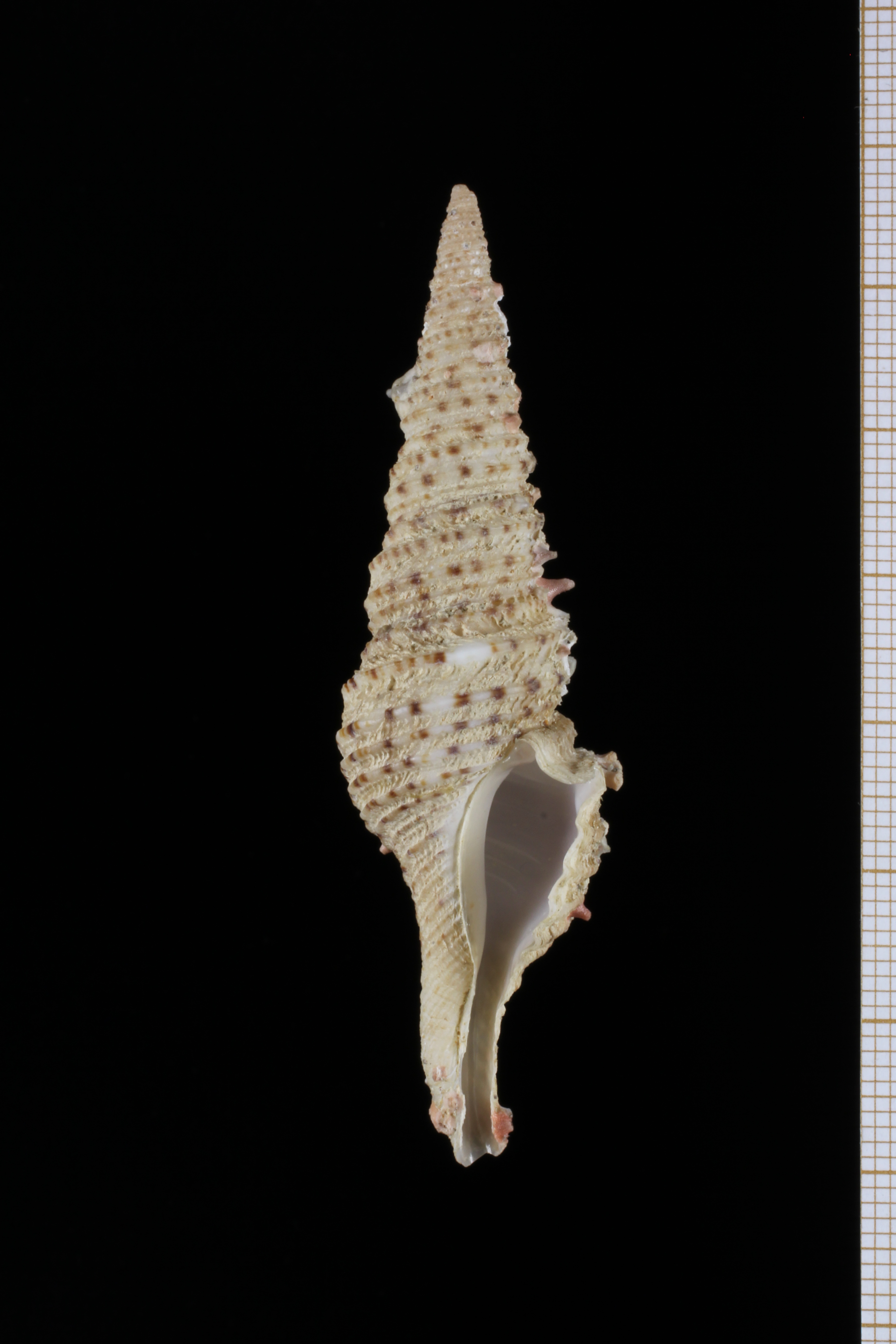

Scientific classification
- Kingdom: Animalia
- Phylum: Mollusca
- Class: Gastropoda
- Subclass: Caenogastropoda
- Order: Neogastropoda
- Family: Turridae
- Genus: Turris
- Species: T. pagasa

Binomial name
- Turris pagasa Olivera, 1999

Synonyms
- Turris kilburni Vera-Pelaez, Vega-Luz & Lozano-Francisco, 2000 (declared junior synonym of T. pagasa by First Reviser's choice by Kilburn et al. (2012))

= Turris pagasa =

Species of gastropod

Turris pagasa is a species of sea snail, a marine gastropod mollusk in the family Turridae, the turrids.

== Description ==
The length of the shell attains 62 mm.

== Distribution ==
This marine species occurs off the Philippines.
