= Crassispira integra =

Scientific classification
- Kingdom: Animalia
- Phylum: Mollusca
- Class: Gastropoda
- Subclass: Caenogastropoda
- Order: Neogastropoda
- Superfamily: Conoidea
- Family: Pseudomelatomidae
- Genus: Crassispira
- Species: C. integra

Binomial name
- Crassispira integra Thiele, 1925

Synonyms
- Turris integra (Thiele, 1925)

Species of gastropod

Crassispira integra is a species of sea snail, a marine gastropod mollusk in the family Pseudomelatomidae.
