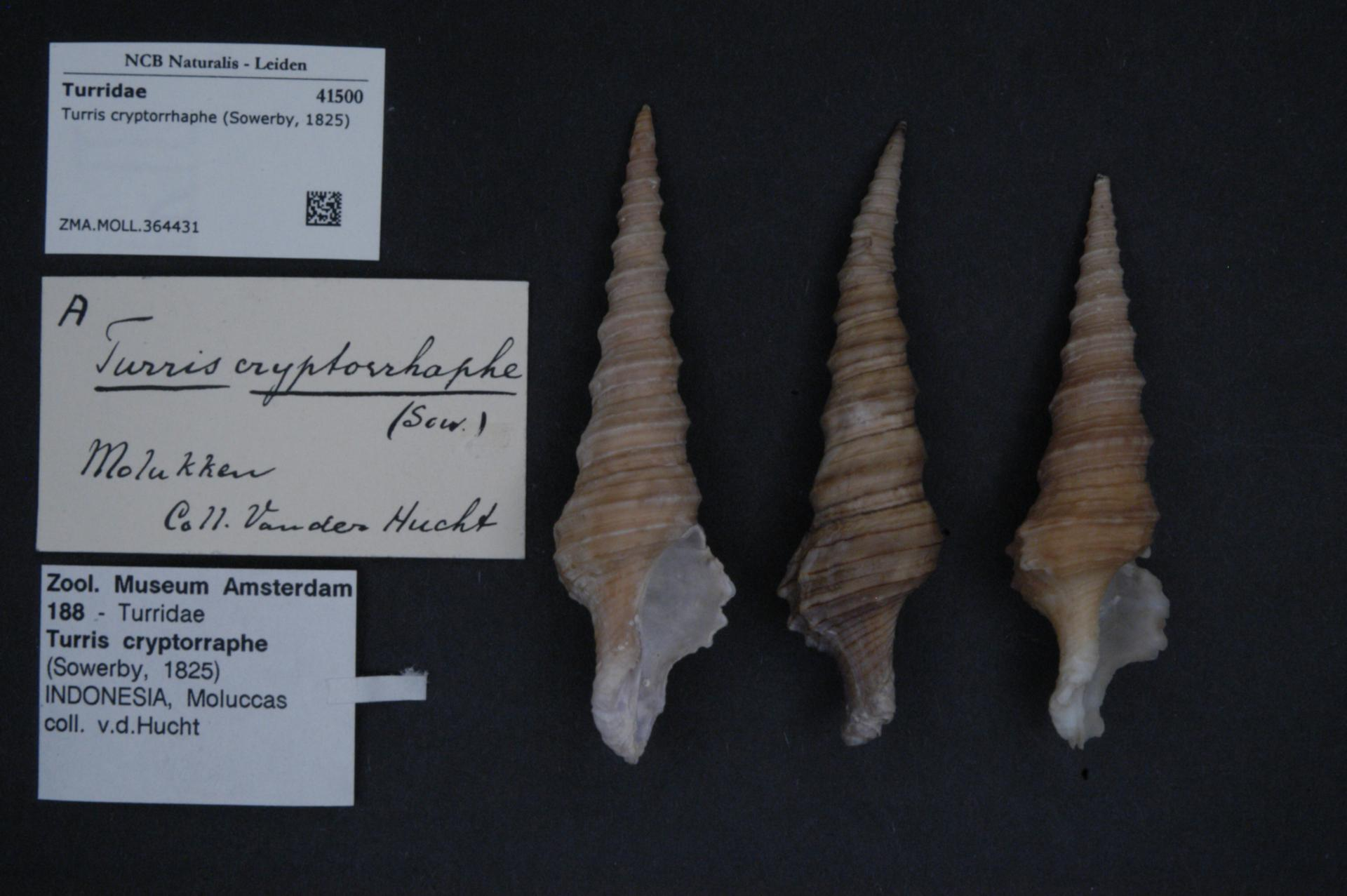

Scientific classification
- Kingdom: Animalia
- Phylum: Mollusca
- Class: Gastropoda
- Subclass: Caenogastropoda
- Order: Neogastropoda
- Family: Turridae
- Genus: Purpuraturris
- Species: P. cryptorrhaphe

Binomial name
- Purpuraturris cryptorrhaphe (Sowerby I, 1825)

Synonyms
- Murex bicarinatus W. Wood, 1828 ·; Pleurotoma 'Hemipleurotoma) cryptorrhaphe Sowerby I, 1825; Pleurotoma woodii Kiener, 1839; Turris cryptorrhaphe (G. B. Sowerby I, 1825) superseded combination; Turris (Polystira) cryptorrhaphe (G.B. Sowerby I, 1825) (subgeneric combination); Turris woodii L.C. Kiener, 1840

= Purpuraturris cryptorraphe =

Species of gastropod

Purpuraturris cryptorrhaphe is a species of sea snail, a marine gastropod mollusk in the family Turridae, the turrids.

== Description ==
The length of the shell 70 mm, its maximum diameter 18 mm.

The shell has a yellowish brown to chestnut-color. It contains two strong sharp keels, and smaller revolving lines. The aperture is frequently tinged with purple.

== Distribution ==
This marine species occurs off Indonesia and Philippines to Papua New Guinea and east to Marshall Islands and Fiji; Queensland, Australia.
