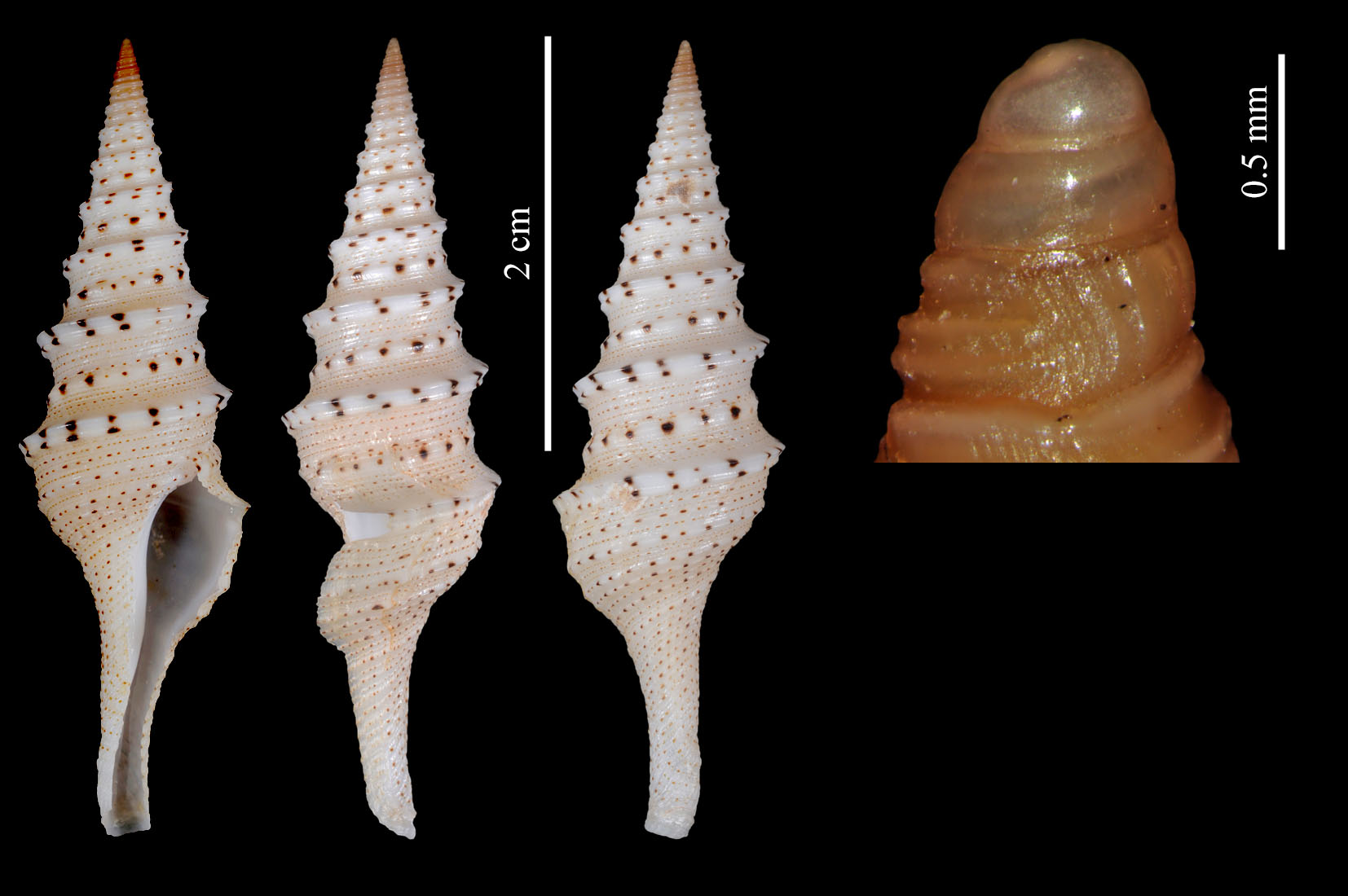
- Shell of Lophiotoma acuta (neotype at MNHN, Paris)

Scientific classification
- Kingdom: Animalia
- Phylum: Mollusca
- Class: Gastropoda
- Subclass: Caenogastropoda
- Order: Neogastropoda
- Superfamily: Conoidea
- Family: Turridae
- Genus: Lophiotoma; Casey, 1904

Type species
- Pleurotoma tigrina Lamarck, 1822

Synonyms
- Lophiotoma (Lophiotoma) T. L. Casey, 1904

= Lophiotoma =

Genus of gastropods

Lophiotoma is a genus of sea snails, marine gastropod mollusks in the family Turridae, the turrids.

Fossils of this genus have been found in many places in the Indo-Pacific, but also going as far back as 61.7 Ma in paleocene strata of Alabama, USA.

== Original description ==
Although having the small smooth embryo of a single whorl, polished surface and obsolete lines of growth, characterizing Pleurotoma (now Turris), this genus may be recognized at once by the relatively shorter and stouter form as a rule, less elongate and straighter beak, which is strongly tapering in certain large forms like line unedo, finer, more acutely elevated and less close-set spiral carinae, with a usually distinct and even, finely lineolate concavity from the peripheral carina to the suture or subsutural collar, the latter being generally present and by the deep anal sinus formed centrally on, and not behind, the peripheral carina, the latter being more strongly elevated and usually subduplex.

== Species ==
Species within the genus Lophiotoma include:

- Lophiotoma abbreviata (Reeve, 1843)
- Lophiotoma acuta (Perry, 1811)
- Lophiotoma bisaya Olivera, 2004
- Lophiotoma bratasusa Puillandre, Fedosov, Zaharias, Aznar-Cormano & Kantor, 2017
- Lophiotoma brevicaudata (Reeve, 1843)
- Lophiotoma capricornica Olivera, 2004
- Lophiotoma dickkilburni Olivera, 2004
- Lophiotoma friedrichbonhoefferi Olivera, 2004
- Lophiotoma hejingorum Stahlschmidt, Poppe & Tagaro, 2018
- Lophiotoma jickelii (Weinkauff, 1875)
- Lophiotoma kina Puillandre, Fedosov, Zaharias, Aznar-Cormano & Kantor, 2017
- Lophiotoma koolhoveni (Oostingh, 1938)
- Lophiotoma leucotropis (A. Adams & Reeve, 1850)
- Lophiotoma madagascarensis Olivera, 2004
- Lophiotoma natalensis Bozzetti, 2016
- Lophiotoma panglaoensis Olivera, 2004
- Lophiotoma picturata (Weinkauff, 1876)
- Lophiotoma polytropa (Helbling, 1779)
- Lophiotoma pseudoannulata Dell, 1990
- Lophiotoma pseudocosmoi Baoquan Li & Xinzheng Li, 2008
- Lophiotoma ruthveniana (Melvill, 1923)
- Lophiotoma semfala Puillandre, Fedosov, Zaharias, Aznar-Cormano & Kantor, 2017
- Lophiotoma tayabasensis Olivera, 2004
- Lophiotoma verticala Baoquan Li & Xinzheng Li, 2008
- Lophiotoma vezzaroi Cossignani, 2015

Species brought into synonymy

- Lophiotoma albina (Lamarck, 1822): synonym of Gemmula albina (Lamarck, 1822)
- Lophiotoma babylonia (Linnaeus, 1758): synonym of Turris babylonia (Linnaeus, 1758)
- Lophiotoma cerithiformis : synonym of Daphnella lirata (Reeve, 1845)
- Lophiotoma cingulifera (Lamarck, 1822): synonym of Iotyrris cingulifera (Lamarck, 1822)
- Lophiotoma indica (Röding, 1798): synonym of Unedogemmula indica (Röding, 1798)
- Lophiotoma notata (G.B. Sowerby III, 1889): synonym of Iotyrris notata (G. B. Sowerby III, 1889)
- Lophiotoma olangoensis Olivera, 2002: synonym of Iotyrris olangoensis (Olivera, 2002) (original combination)
- Lophiotoma tigrina Lamarck, 1822: synonym of Lophiotoma acuta (Perry, 1811)
- Lophiotoma (Xenuroturris) incredula Iredale, T., 1931: synonym of Iotyrris cingulifera cingulifera (Lamarck, J.B.P.A. de, 1822)
