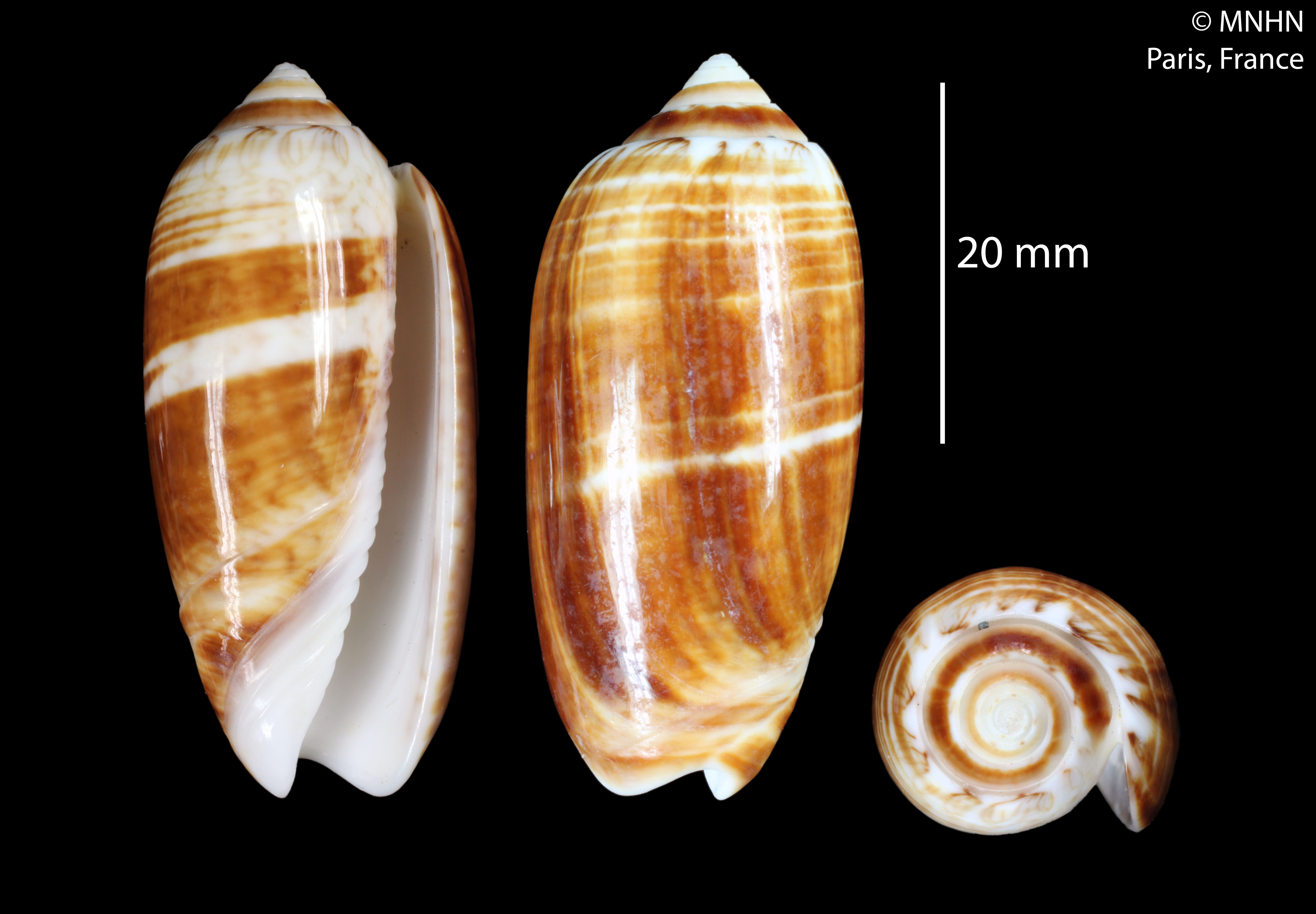
- Shell of Oliva bifasciata (specimen at MNHN, Paris)

Scientific classification
- Kingdom: Animalia
- Phylum: Mollusca
- Class: Gastropoda
- Subclass: Caenogastropoda
- Order: Neogastropoda
- Family: Olividae
- Genus: Oliva
- Species: O. bifasciata

Binomial name
- Oliva bifasciata Weinkauff, 1878

Synonyms
- Oliva (Americoliva) bifasciata Kuster, 1878· accepted, alternate representation; Oliva bifasciata bifasciata Weinkauff, 1878· accepted, alternate representation; Oliva magdae Petuch & Sargent, 1986

= Oliva bifasciata =

Species of gastropod

Oliva bifasciata is a species of sea snail, a marine gastropod mollusk in the family Olividae, the olives.

== Synonyms ==
- Oliva bifasciata bollingi Clench, 1934: synonym of Americoliva nivosa bollingi (Clench, 1934) accepted as Oliva nivosa bollingi Clench, 1934 (basionym)
- Oliva bifasciata jenseni Petuch & Sargent, 1986: synonym of Americoliva nivosa nivosa (Marrat, 1871) accepted as Oliva nivosa nivosa Marrat, 1871

== Distribution ==
This marine species occurs off Guadeloupe and Bermuda.
