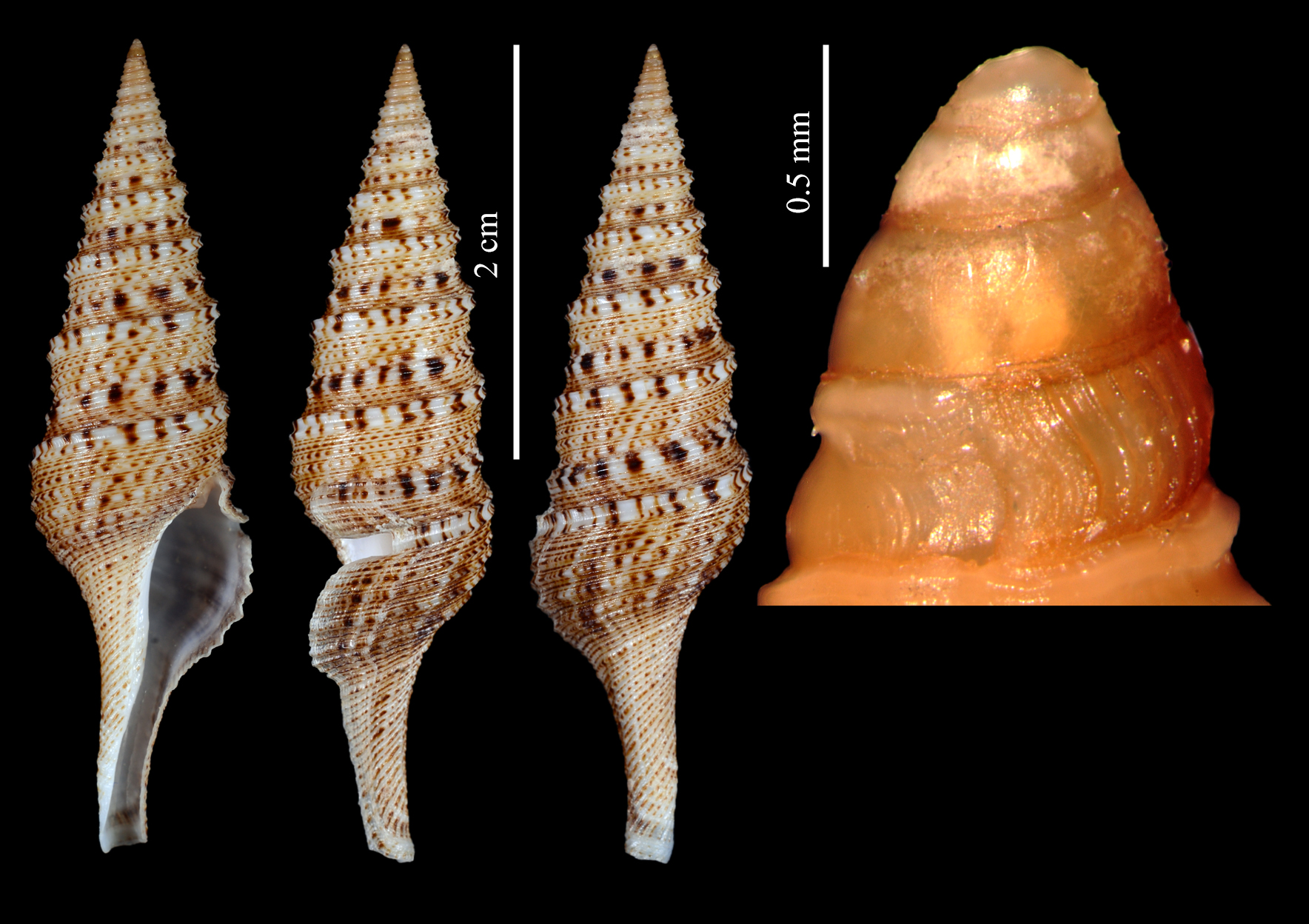
- Shell of Lophiotoma jickelii (neotype at MNHN, Paris)

Scientific classification
- Kingdom: Animalia
- Phylum: Mollusca
- Class: Gastropoda
- Subclass: Caenogastropoda
- Order: Neogastropoda
- Superfamily: Conoidea
- Family: Turridae
- Genus: Lophiotoma
- Species: L. jickelii

Binomial name
- Lophiotoma jickelii (Weinkauff, 1875)

Synonyms
- Lophiotoma (Lophiotoma) jickelii (Weinkauff, 1875); Pleurotoma jickelii Weinkauff, 1875 (original combination)

= Lophiotoma jickelii =

Species of gastropod

Lophiotoma jickelii is a species of sea snail, a marine gastropod mollusk in the family Turridae.

== Description ==
The length of the shell attains 39.4 mm, its diameter 13 mm.

The narrow fusiform shell is multicarinated. Its color is white. The shell is interspersed with quadrangular chestnut spots dotted along the length in undulated lines in revolving series; the spots are on the seam keel. The turreted spire contains 11 convex whorls with five keels and numerous fine stripes in between. The second keel is double in size and becomes the main keel. It protrudes strongly, making the whorls angular and gives them a stair-like appearance. The suture is simple. The aperture is ovate and whitish inside. The columella is straight. The siphonal canal is elongated, only slightly thickened at the beginning. The outer lip is sharp and slightly fissured, with a rather short incision at the anal sinus, ending in the doubled keel.

== Distribution ==
This marine species occurs off Papua New Guinea
