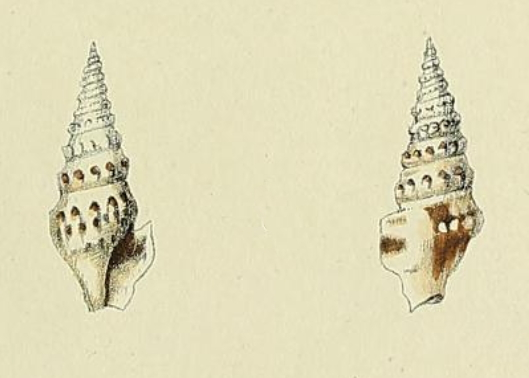
- Shell of Crassispira schillingi (holotype)

Scientific classification
- Kingdom: Animalia
- Phylum: Mollusca
- Class: Gastropoda
- Subclass: Caenogastropoda
- Order: Neogastropoda
- Superfamily: Conoidea
- Family: Pseudomelatomidae
- Genus: Crassispira
- Species: C. schillingi

Binomial name
- Crassispira schillingi (Weinkauff, H.C. & W. Kobelt, 1876)

Synonyms
- Pleurotoma (Drillia) schillingi Weinkauff, H.C. & W. Kobelt, 1876

= Crassispira schillingi =

Species of gastropod

Crassispira schillingi is a species of sea snail, a marine gastropod mollusk in the family Pseudomelatomidae.

== Description ==
The length of the shell attains 18 mm, its diameter 7 mm.

(Original description in German) The shell is almost spindle-shaped, encircled spirally with ridges and smaller ridges, and ribbed lengthwise, marked yellowish with brown bands. The spire is turret-shaped, and consists of 9 whorls that are impressed (indented) at the top and otherwise flat. These whorls bear a ridge at the suture and many fine ridges in the impressed area. On the remaining parts, they exhibit ridges with intermediate ridges, and from the middle to the next suture, they carry narrow and numerous straight longitudinal ribs. The brown band runs in the impressed sutural area. The suture is simple. The protoconch is shiny-smooth and brown, comprising 2 whorls (missing apex). The aperture is oval, ashen gray inside, and ends in a short, wide siphonal canal that is truncated and emarginated at the end. The columella is only curved at the top, otherwise straight, lightly coated, and callous above. The peristome is sharp, and bears a not-wide sinus in the subsutural area at the top.

== Distribution ==
This marine species occurs in the Indian Ocean off Zanzibar
