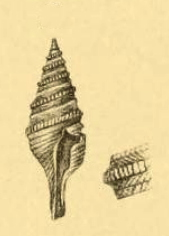
- Original image of a shell of Anisogemmula graeffei

Scientific classification
- Kingdom: Animalia
- Phylum: Mollusca
- Class: Gastropoda
- Subclass: Caenogastropoda
- Order: Neogastropoda
- Superfamily: Conoidea
- Family: Turridae
- Genus: Anisogemmula
- Species: A. graeffei

Binomial name
- Anisogemmula graeffei (Weinkauff, 1875)

Synonyms
- Gemmula graeffei (Weinkauff, 1875) superseded combination; Gemmula (Gemmula) graeffei (Weinkauff, 1875); Pleurotoma graeffei Weinkauff, 1875 (original combination); Pleurotoma punctata auct. [not punctata Reeve].

= Anisogemmula graeffei =

Species of gastropod

Anisogemmula graeffei, common name Graeffe's turrid, is a species of sea snail, a marine gastropod mollusk in the family Turridae, the turrids.

== Description ==
The length of the shell varies between 13 mm and 35 mm.

The brownish, fusiform shell is crenulately carinate or cingulate. The ribs are lighter-colored. The median carina is stronger, with larger crenulations. The acute apex is corneous and consists of 3½ whorls. The first one is smooth, the others longitudinally plicate. The ovate aperture is plicate within. The columella is upright. The siphonal canal is long and narrow, with a narrow slit above. The acute outer lip is curved

== Distribution ==
This marine species occurs off the Fiji Islands; Queensland, Australia; the Philippines.
