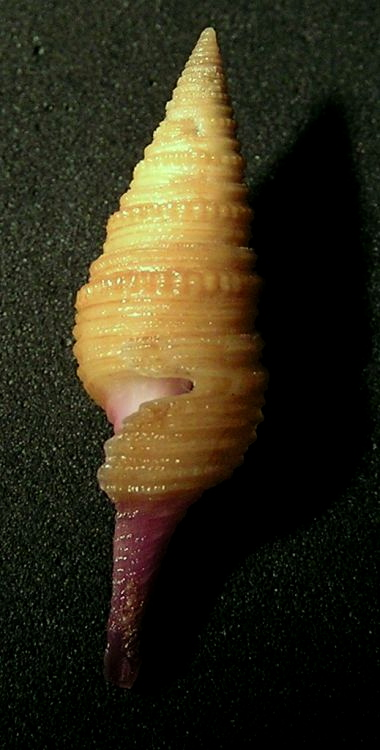
- Shell of Anisogemmula lisajoni

Scientific classification
- Kingdom: Animalia
- Phylum: Mollusca
- Class: Gastropoda
- Subclass: Caenogastropoda
- Order: Neogastropoda
- Superfamily: Conoidea
- Family: Turridae
- Genus: Anisogemmula
- Species: A. lisajoni

Binomial name
- Anisogemmula lisajoni Olivera, 1999

Synonyms
- Gemmula lisajoni B. M. Olivera, 1999 superseded combination; Gemmula (Gemmula) lisajoni Olivera, 1999; Pleurotoma concinna Dunker, 1857 (invalid; not Scacchi, 1836)

= Anisogemmula lisajoni =

Species of gastropod

Anisogemmula lisajoni is a species of sea snail, a marine gastropod mollusk in the family Turridae, the turrids.

== Description ==
The length of the shell varies between 20 mm and 35 mm. It has a brown spire with a distinctive purplish-violet siphonal canal.

It is related to Gemmula ambara Olivera et al., 2008 and Gemmula rosario Shikama, 1977

== Distribution ==
This marine species occurs off the Philippines.
