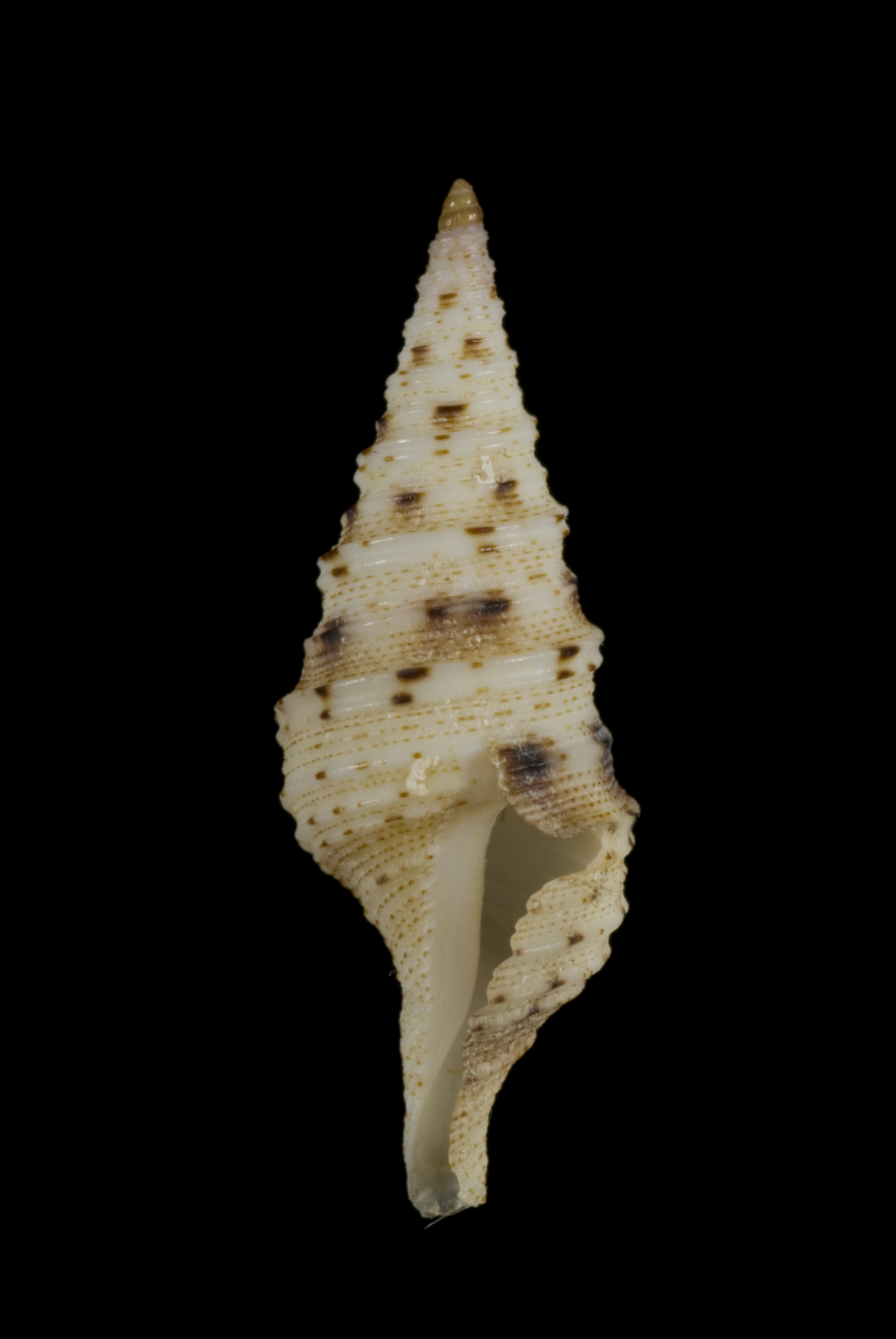
- Shell of Lophiotoma picturata (specimen at MNHN, Paris)

Scientific classification
- Kingdom: Animalia
- Phylum: Mollusca
- Class: Gastropoda
- Subclass: Caenogastropoda
- Order: Neogastropoda
- Superfamily: Conoidea
- Family: Turridae
- Genus: Lophiotoma
- Species: L. picturata

Binomial name
- Lophiotoma picturata (Weinkauff, 1876)

Synonyms
- Pleurotoma picturata Weinkauff, 1876 (original combination)

= Lophiotoma picturata =

Species of gastropod

Lophiotoma picturata is a species of sea snail, a marine gastropod mollusk in the family Turridae.

== Description ==
The length of the shell attains 43 mm, its diameter 14.5 mm.

The shell is bluntly carinated by a pair of approximated revolving ribs, with numerous smaller but unequal ribs. Its color is white, with chestnut spots, sometimes coalescing into longitudinal stripes, and a row of larger spots at the suture. The spire contains 11 slightly convex whorls. These are separated by a fine, often barely visible suture. The aperture is oblong, whitish inside. The elongate siphonal canal is much shorter than in the other species of this genus. The columella is straight. The outer lip is sharp and slightly fissured, with a rather short incision on top, ending in the doubled keel.

== Distribution ==
This marine species occurs in the Indian Ocean and off Papua New Guinea.
