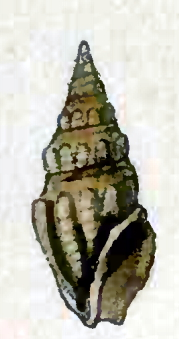
- Drawing of a shell of Drillia clionellaeformis

Scientific classification
- Kingdom: Animalia
- Phylum: Mollusca
- Class: Gastropoda
- Subclass: Caenogastropoda
- Order: Neogastropoda
- Superfamily: Conoidea
- Family: Drilliidae
- Genus: Drillia
- Species: D. clionellaeformis

Binomial name
- Drillia clionellaeformis (Weinkauff & Kobelt, 1875)

Synonyms
- Pleurotoma (Crassispira) clionellaeformis Weinkauff & Kobelt, 1875; Turris clionellaeformis (Weinkauff & Kobelt, 1875)

= Drillia clionellaeformis =

Species of gastropod

Drillia clionellaeformis is a species of sea snail, a marine gastropod mollusk in the family Drilliidae.

== Description ==
The shell attains a length of 22 mm.

The yellowish shell is longitudinally plicate, the plicae whitish, closely covered by revolving lines. The whorls are contracted and unilirate at the suture.

== Distribution ==
This species occurs in the Atlantic Ocean off Angola at depths between 15 m and 35 m.
