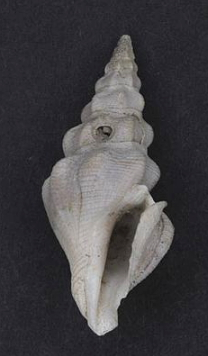
- Apertural view of a shell of Drillia dunkeri (museum specimen at Naturalis Biodiversity Center)

Scientific classification
- Kingdom: Animalia
- Phylum: Mollusca
- Class: Gastropoda
- Subclass: Caenogastropoda
- Order: Neogastropoda
- Superfamily: Conoidea
- Family: Drilliidae
- Genus: Drillia
- Species: D. dunkeri

Binomial name
- Drillia dunkeri (Weinkauff, 1876)

= Drillia dunkeri =

Species of gastropod

Drillia dunkeri is a species of sea snail, a marine gastropod mollusk in the family Drilliidae.

The homonym Drillia dunkeri Knudsen, 1952 is a synonym of Drillia knudseni Tippett, 2006

== Description ==
The length of the shell attains 31 mm.

== Distribution ==
This species occurs in the demersal zone of the Atlantic Ocean off West Africa.
