= Lophiotoma koolhoveni =

Scientific classification
- Kingdom: Animalia
- Phylum: Mollusca
- Class: Gastropoda
- Subclass: Caenogastropoda
- Order: Neogastropoda
- Superfamily: Conoidea
- Family: Turridae
- Genus: Lophiotoma
- Species: L. koolhoveni

Binomial name
- Lophiotoma koolhoveni (Oostingh, 1938)

Synonyms
- Gemmula (Unedogemmula) koolhoveni Powell, 1964; Turris (Gemmula) koolhoveni Oostingh, 1938

Species of gastropod

Lophiotoma koolhoveni is a species of sea snail, a marine gastropod mollusk in the family Turridae, the turrids.

== Description ==
The length of the shell varies between 17.8 mm and 42.5 mm.

== Distribution ==
This marine species occurs off Java, Indonesia; in the South China Sea. Fossils were found in Pliocene strata in Bantam, Java.
