= Lophiotoma vezzaroi =

Scientific classification
- Kingdom: Animalia
- Phylum: Mollusca
- Class: Gastropoda
- Subclass: Caenogastropoda
- Order: Neogastropoda
- Superfamily: Conoidea
- Family: Turridae
- Genus: Lophiotoma
- Species: L. vezzaroi

Binomial name
- Lophiotoma vezzaroi T. Cossignani, 2015

Species of gastropod

Lophiotoma vezzaroi is a species of sea snail, a marine gastropod mollusk in the family Turridae, the turrids.

== Description ==
The length of the shell attains 24 mm.

== Distribution ==
This marine species occurs off the Philippines.
