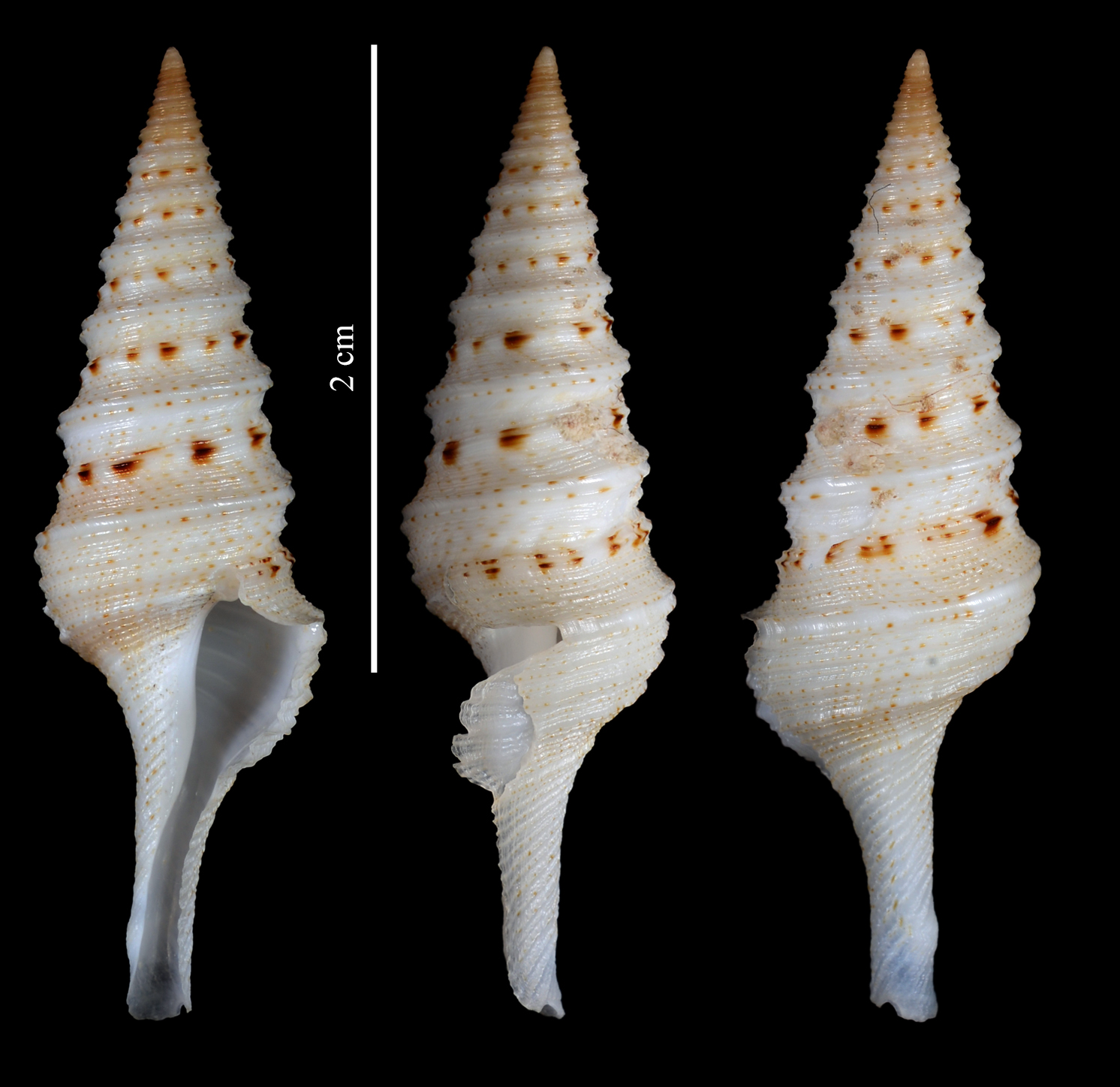
- Shell of Lophiotoma kina(holotype at MNHN, Paris)

Scientific classification
- Kingdom: Animalia
- Phylum: Mollusca
- Class: Gastropoda
- Subclass: Caenogastropoda
- Order: Neogastropoda
- Superfamily: Conoidea
- Family: Turridae
- Genus: Lophiotoma
- Species: L. kina

Binomial name
- Lophiotoma kina Puillandre, Fedosov, Zaharias, Aznar-Cormano & Kantor, 2017

= Lophiotoma kina =

Species of sea snail

Lophiotoma kina is a species of sea snail, a marine gastropod mollusk in the family Turridae. It was described in 2017 as part of an integrative-taxonomy revision of the genus Lophiotoma.

== Taxonomy ==
Lophiotoma kina was established by Puillandre, Kantor, Sysoev, Couloux & Bouchet (2017) during a multilocus phylogenetic study that redefined species limits within Lophiotoma. The species is listed under Turridae in subsequent taxonomic treatments.

== Description ==
Shell morphology follows the elongate-fusiform Lophiotoma habit with an elevated spire and siphonal canal, as diagnosed for the genus in the original revision. A detailed species-level description (including sculpture and protoconch characters) is provided in the type paper.

== Distribution ==
Lophiotoma kina has been reported from the tropical western Pacific, including waters off Papua New Guinea and Vanuatu.
