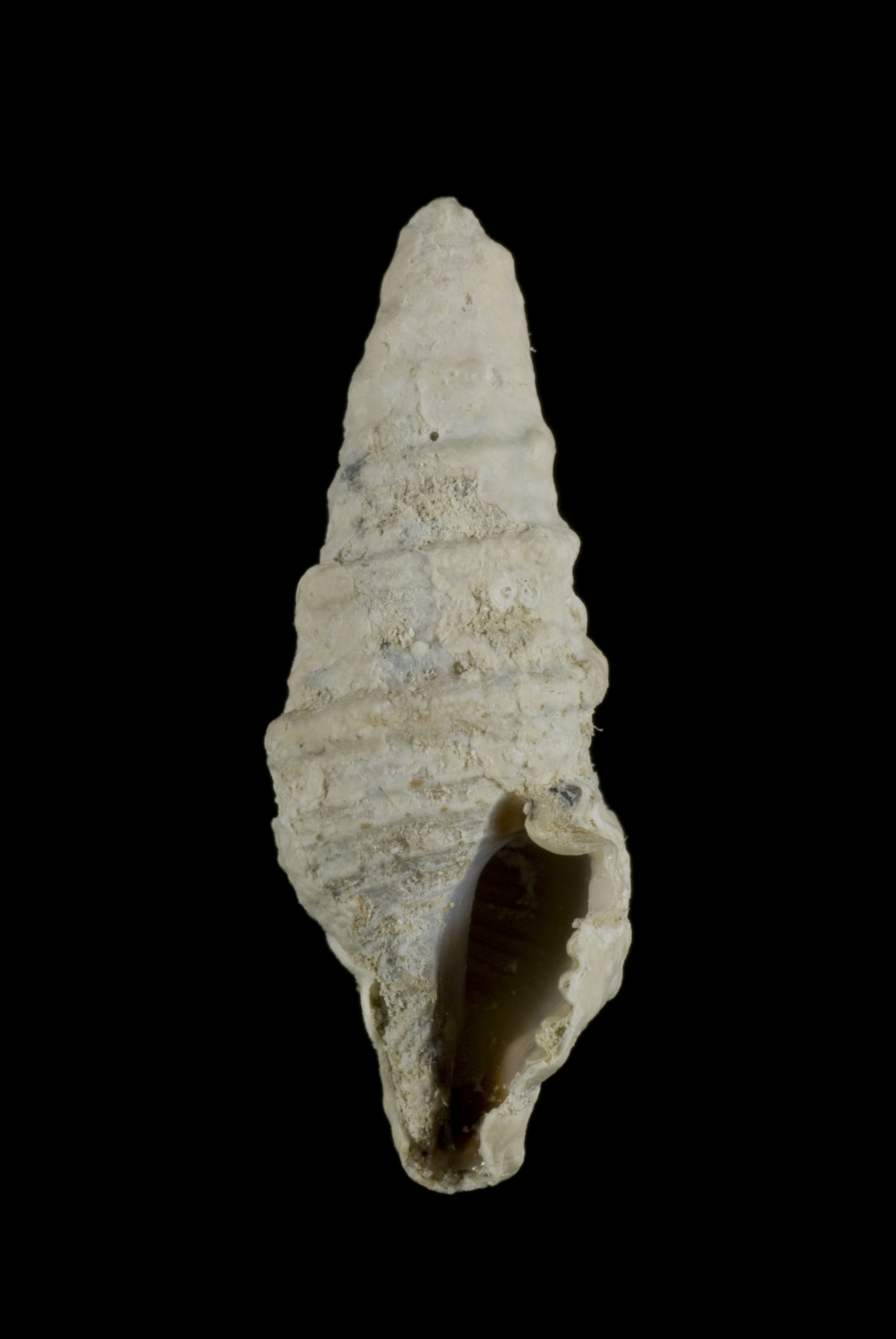
- Lophiotoma abbreviata shell (specimen at MNHN, Paris)

Scientific classification
- Kingdom: Animalia
- Phylum: Mollusca
- Class: Gastropoda
- Subclass: Caenogastropoda
- Order: Neogastropoda
- Superfamily: Conoidea
- Family: Turridae
- Genus: Lophiotoma
- Species: L. abbreviata

Binomial name
- Lophiotoma abbreviata (Reeve, 1843)

Synonyms
- Pleurotoma (Turris) abbreviata Reeve, 1843; Pleurotoma abbreviata Reeve, 1843; Turris abbreviata (Reeve, 1843)

= Lophiotoma abbreviata =

Species of gastropod

Lophiotoma abbreviata is a species of sea snail, a marine gastropod mollusk in the family Turridae, the turrids.

Subspecies

- Lophiotoma abbreviata abbreviata (Reeve, 1843)
- Lophiotoma abbreviata lifuensis (G. B. Sowerby III, 1907)
- Lophiotoma abbreviata ustulata (Reeve, 1846)

== Description ==
The fusiform shell reaches a length of 35 mm and a diameter of 12–15 mm. The shell is rather stout, with a prominent shoulder keel, composed of two approximate ribs, and less prominent revolving ribs and lines below it, articulated with dark chestnut spots. The shell is above the keel concave, with a strong rounded sutural rib, marked by large dark chestnut spots.

== Distribution ==
This marine species occurs along the Mascarene basin and the Philippines.
