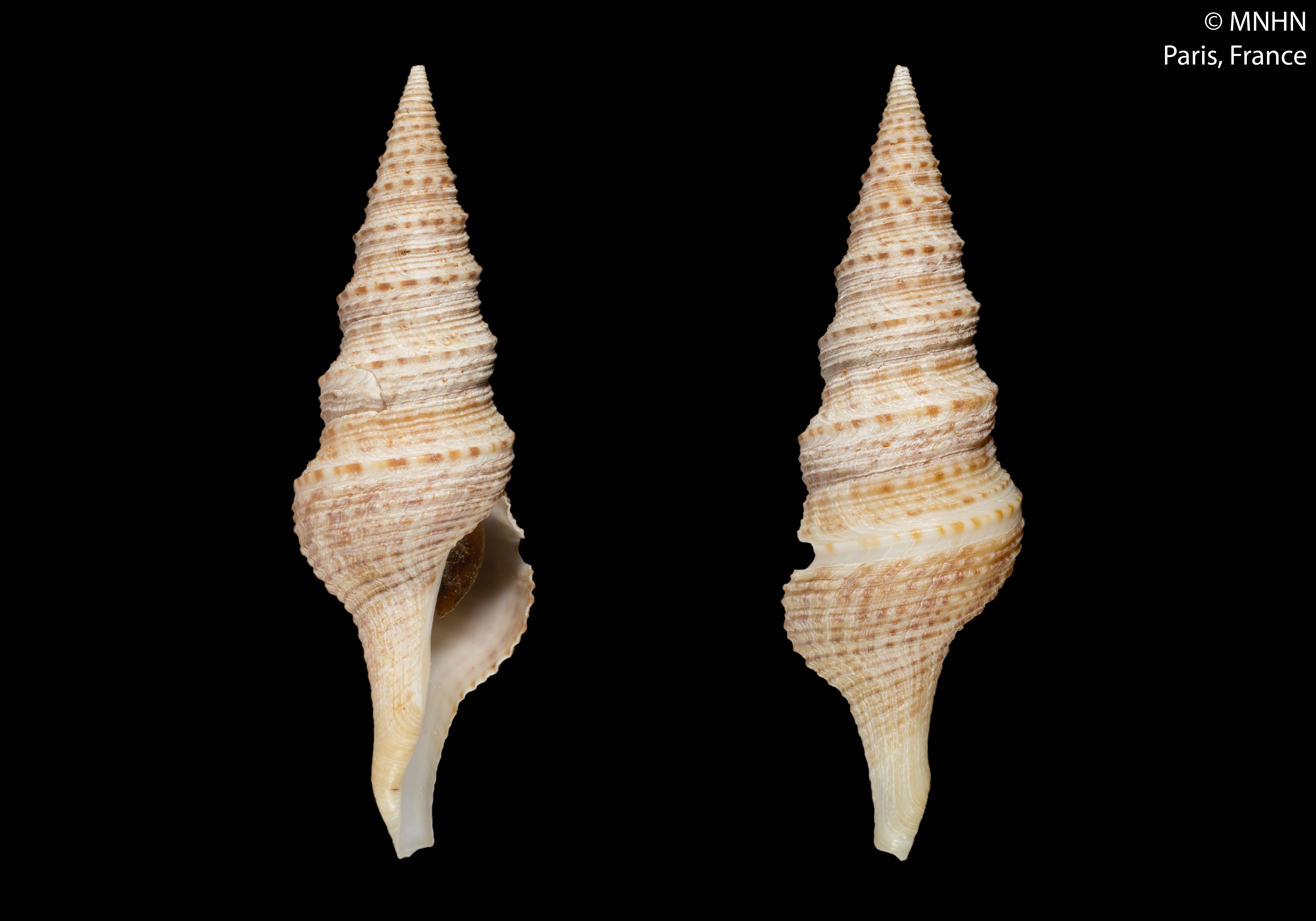
- Shell of Lophiotoma dickkilburni (holotype at MNHN, Paris)

Scientific classification
- Kingdom: Animalia
- Phylum: Mollusca
- Class: Gastropoda
- Subclass: Caenogastropoda
- Order: Neogastropoda
- Superfamily: Conoidea
- Family: Turridae
- Genus: Lophiotoma
- Species: L. dickkilburni

Binomial name
- Lophiotoma dickkilburni Olivera, 2004

Synonyms
- Gemmula (Unedogemmula) dickkilburni (Olivera, 2004)

= Lophiotoma dickkilburni =

Species of gastropod

Lophiotoma dickkilburni is a species of sea snail, a marine gastropod mollusk in the family Turridae, the turrids.

== Distribution ==
This marine species occurs off Natal, South Africa, Southern Mozambique and Southern India.
