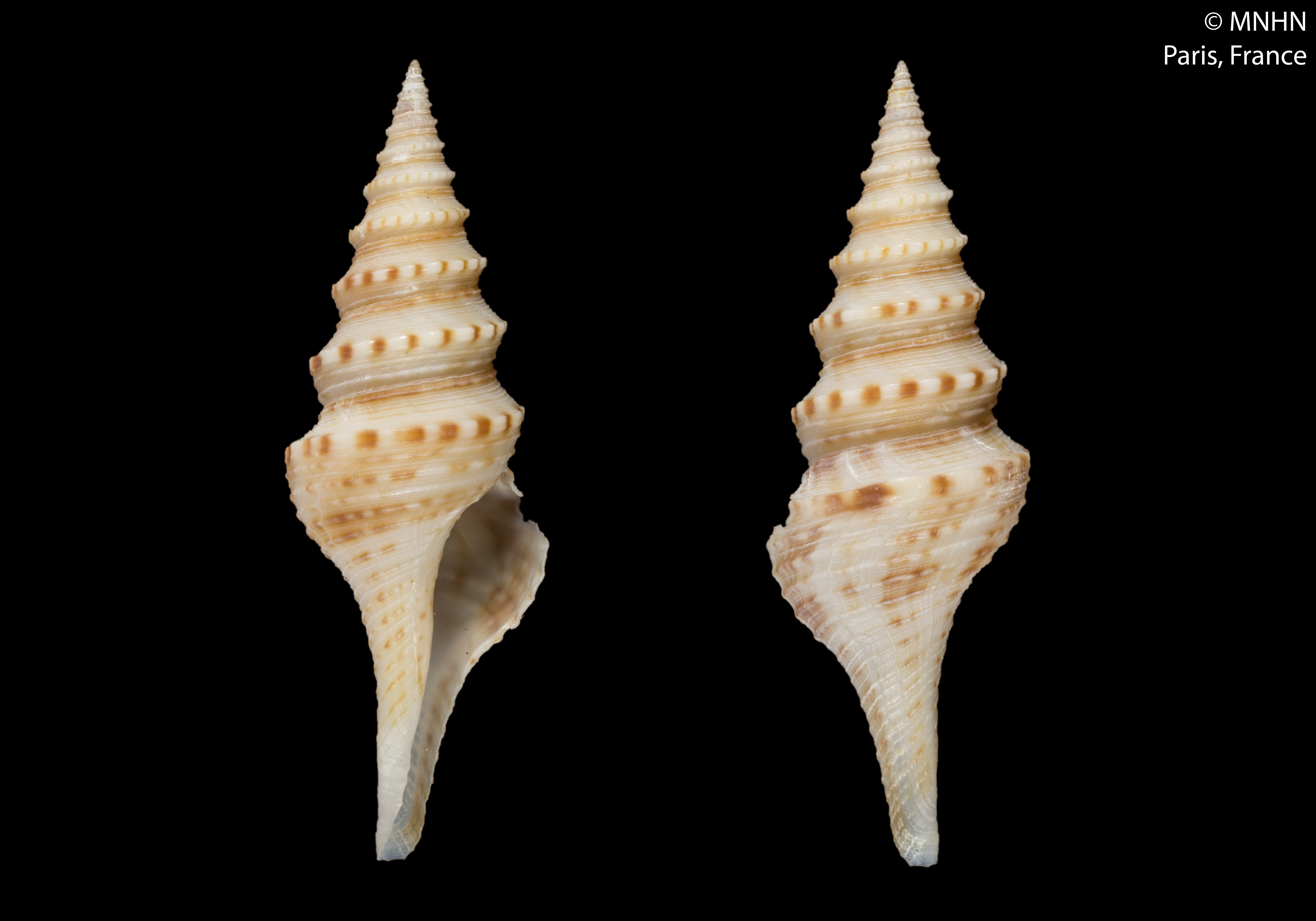
- Shell of Lophiotoma madagascarensis (holotype at MNHN, Paris)

Scientific classification
- Kingdom: Animalia
- Phylum: Mollusca
- Class: Gastropoda
- Subclass: Caenogastropoda
- Order: Neogastropoda
- Superfamily: Conoidea
- Family: Turridae
- Genus: Lophiotoma
- Species: L. madagascarensis

Binomial name
- Lophiotoma madagascarensis Olivera, 2004

= Lophiotoma madagascarensis =

Species of gastropod

Lophiotoma madagascarensis is a species of sea snail, a marine gastropod mollusk in the family Turridae, the turrids.

== Description ==
The length of the shell attains 44.7 mm.

This mollusc is a type of sea snail that like snails on land has a shell it can retract back into.

== Distribution ==
This marine species occurs off Madagascar.
