= Lophiotoma pseudocosmoi =

Scientific classification
- Kingdom: Animalia
- Phylum: Mollusca
- Class: Gastropoda
- Subclass: Caenogastropoda
- Order: Neogastropoda
- Superfamily: Conoidea
- Family: Turridae
- Genus: Lophiotoma
- Species: L. pseudocosmoi

Binomial name
- Lophiotoma pseudocosmoi Baoquan Li & Xinzheng Li, 2008

Species of gastropod

Lophiotoma pseudocosmoi is a species of sea snail, a marine gastropod mollusk in the family Turridae, the turrids.

== Description ==
The length of the shell is 17 mm and its diameter is 6.9 mm.

It is close in appearance to Gemmula cosmoi (Sykes, 1930), but differs by the peripheral carina and the height of its shell.

== Distribution ==
This species occurs in the China Seas.
