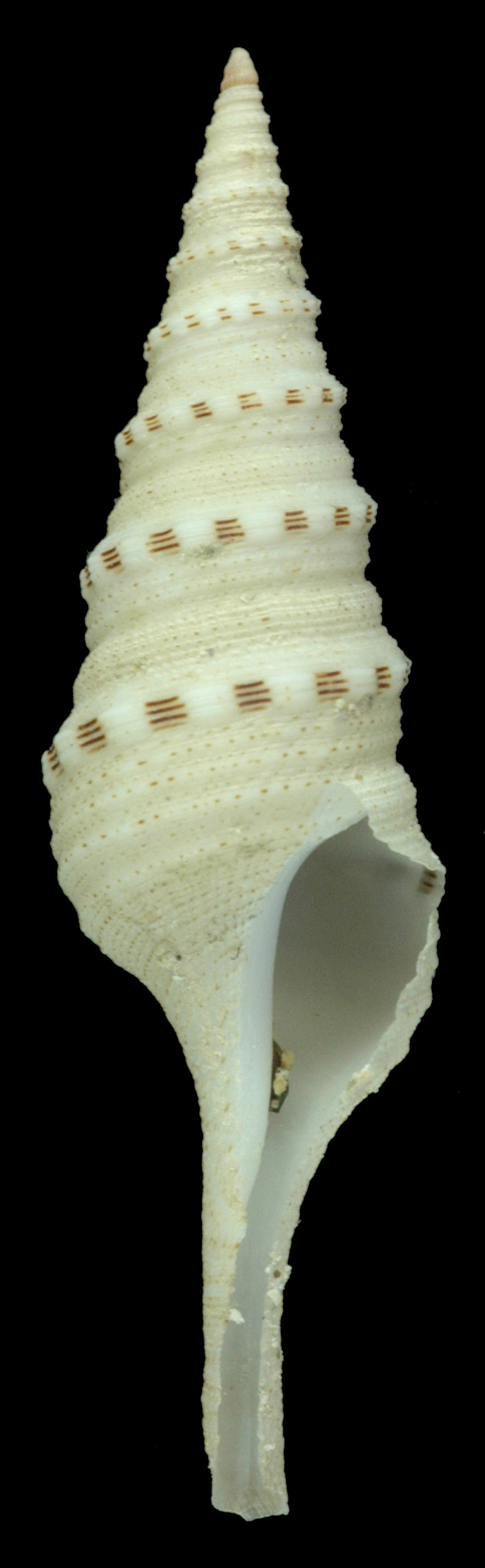
- Shell of Anisogemmula albina (specimen at MNHN, Paris)

Scientific classification
- Kingdom: Animalia
- Phylum: Mollusca
- Class: Gastropoda
- Subclass: Caenogastropoda
- Order: Neogastropoda
- Superfamily: Conoidea
- Family: Turridae
- Genus: Anisogemmula; Kantor, Bouchet, Fedosov, Puillandre & Zaharias, 2024

Type species
- Pleurotoma albina Lamarck, 1822

= Anisogemmula =

Genus of gastropods

Anisogemmula is a genus of marine gastropod molluscs or micromolluscs in the family Turridae, the turrids.

== Species ==
- Anisogemmula albina (Lamarck, 1822)
- Anisogemmula ambara (B. M. Olivera, Hillyard & Watkins, 2008)
- Anisogemmula graeffei (Weinkauff, 1875)
- Anisogemmula lisajoni (B. M. Olivera, 1999)
