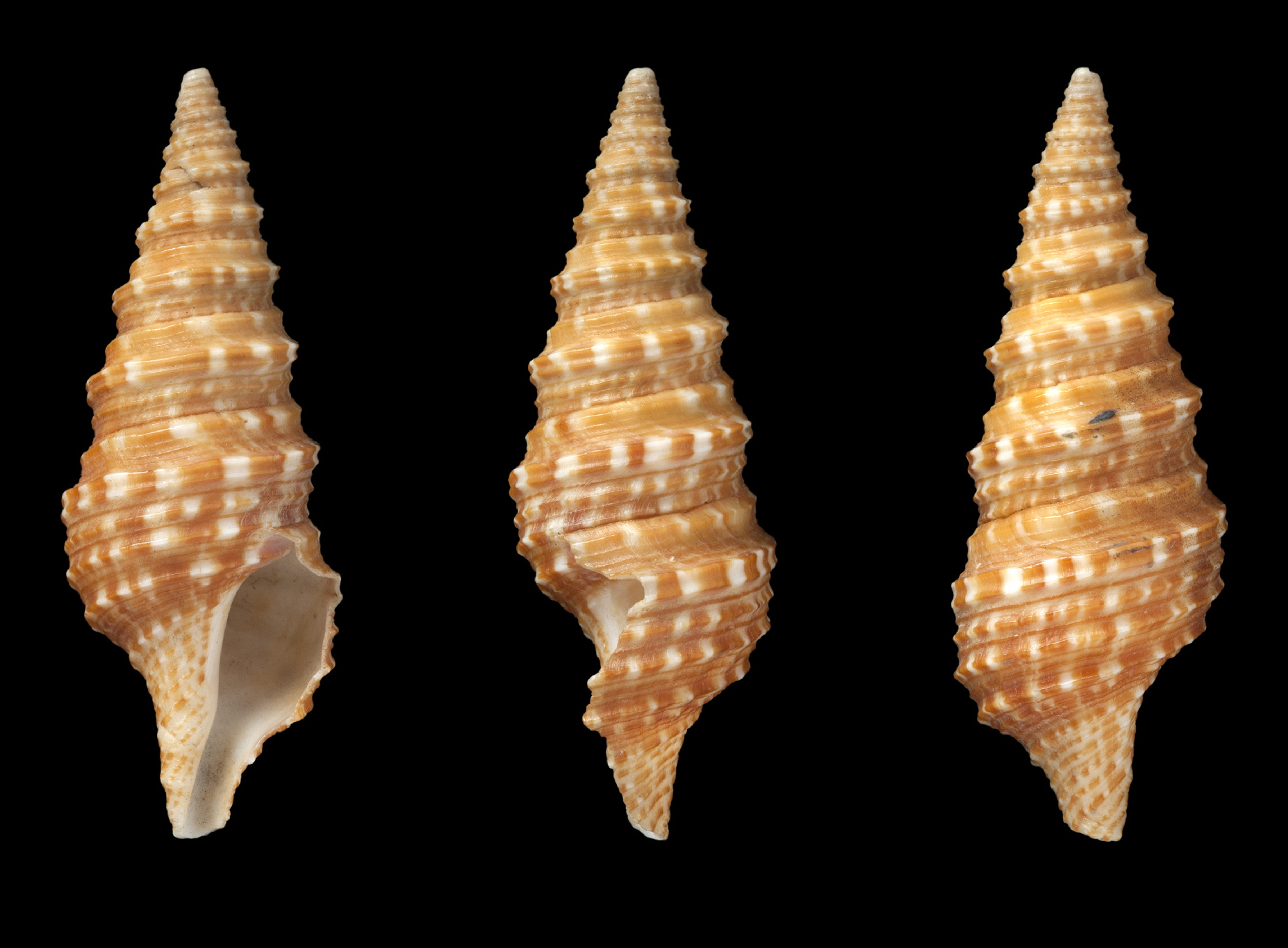
- Shell of Lophiotoma ruthveniana (holotype at Natural History Museum, London)

Scientific classification
- Kingdom: Animalia
- Phylum: Mollusca
- Class: Gastropoda
- Subclass: Caenogastropoda
- Order: Neogastropoda
- Superfamily: Conoidea
- Family: Turridae
- Genus: Lophiotoma
- Species: L. ruthveniana

Binomial name
- Lophiotoma ruthveniana (Melvill, 1923)

Synonyms
- Turris ruthveniana Melvill, 1923

= Lophiotoma ruthveniana =

Species of gastropod

Lophiotoma ruthveniana is a species of sea snail, a marine gastropod mollusk in the family Turridae, the turrids.

== Description ==
The length of the shell attains 41.5 mm, its diameter 14 mm.

Original description:

The thick shell has a fusiform shape. The shell contains ten whorls (including the two protoconch whorls). They are somewhat compressed, especially the upper whorls. The colour of the shell is bright chestnut brown, with squarrose, fairly regular, white tessellations on the spiral carinae. These revolving keels appertain throughout — one, in particular, central, and subdivided by a shallow sulcus. The lesser tornate keels increase numerically in each of the lower whorls, till, on the body whorl, they total five or six, all beautifully variegated with white and chestnut alternately, as mentioned above. The aperture is ovate-oblong. The wide siphonal canal is abbreviate. The anal sinus is well expressed, wide, and deep. The columellar margin is fairly straight.

== Distribution ==
This marine species occurs off Mauritius.
