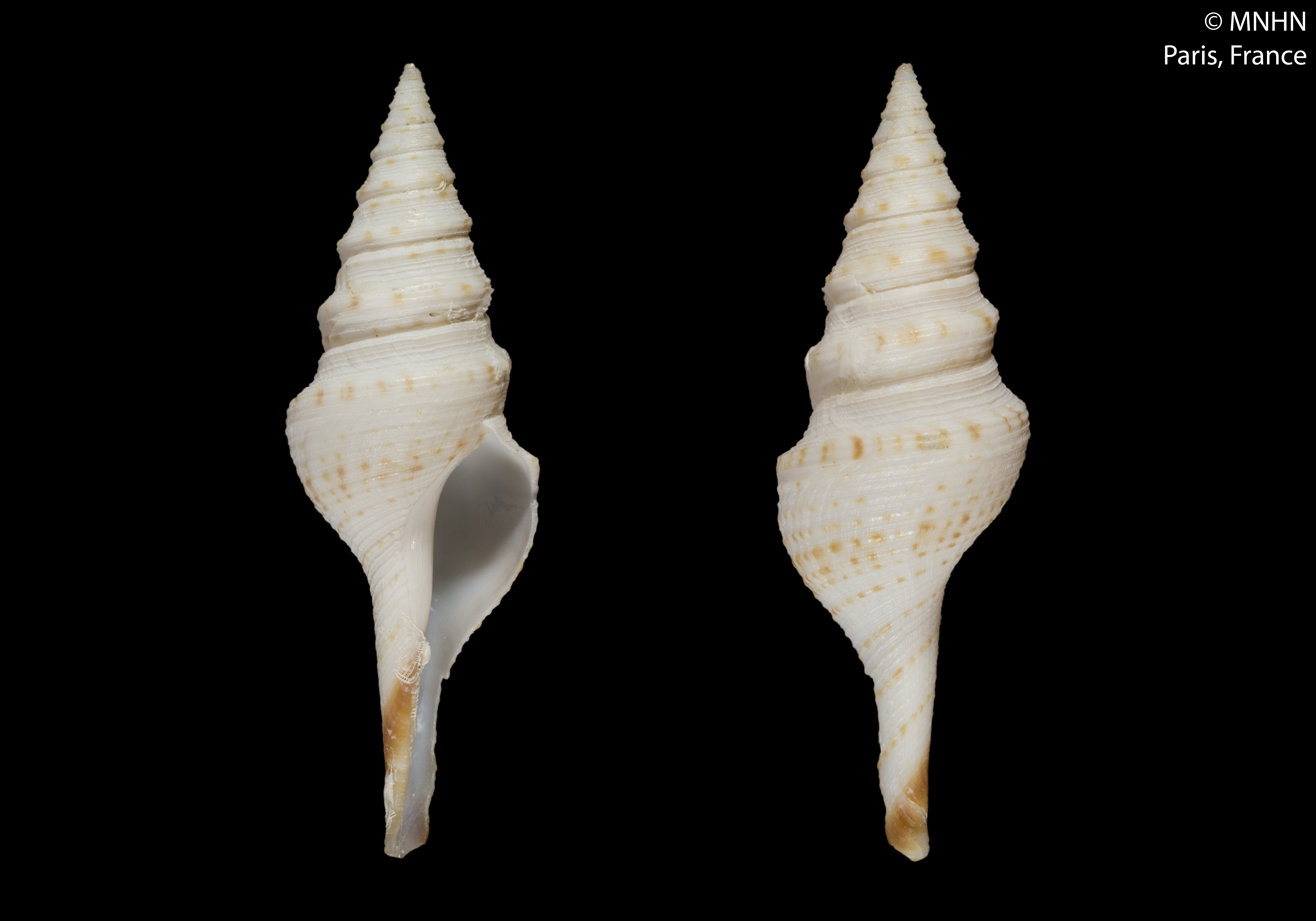
- Shell of Lophiotoma capricornica (holotype at MNHN, Paris)

Scientific classification
- Kingdom: Animalia
- Phylum: Mollusca
- Class: Gastropoda
- Subclass: Caenogastropoda
- Order: Neogastropoda
- Superfamily: Conoidea
- Family: Turridae
- Genus: Lophiotoma
- Species: L. capricornica

Binomial name
- Lophiotoma capricornica Olivera, 2004

= Lophiotoma capricornica =

Species of gastropod

Lophiotoma capricornica is a species of sea snail, a marine gastropod mollusk in the family Turridae, the turrids.

== Description ==
The length of the shell attains 54.3 mm.

== Distribution ==
This marine species occurs off Queensland, Australia.
