= Lophiotoma tayabasensis =

Scientific classification
- Kingdom: Animalia
- Phylum: Mollusca
- Class: Gastropoda
- Subclass: Caenogastropoda
- Order: Neogastropoda
- Superfamily: Conoidea
- Family: Turridae
- Genus: Lophiotoma
- Species: L. tayabasensis

Binomial name
- Lophiotoma tayabasensis Olivera, 2004

Synonyms
- Gemmula (Unedogemmula) tayabasensis (Olivera, 2004)

Species of mollusc

Lophiotoma tayabasensis is a species of sea snail, a marine gastropod mollusk in the family Turridae, the turrids. The species is currently accepted under the name Unedogemmula tayabasensis (Olivera, 2004); Lophiotoma tayabasensis is its original combination.

== Description ==
The length of the shell varies between 70 mm and 110 mm.

== Distribution ==
This marine species occurs off the Philippines and Southern India.
