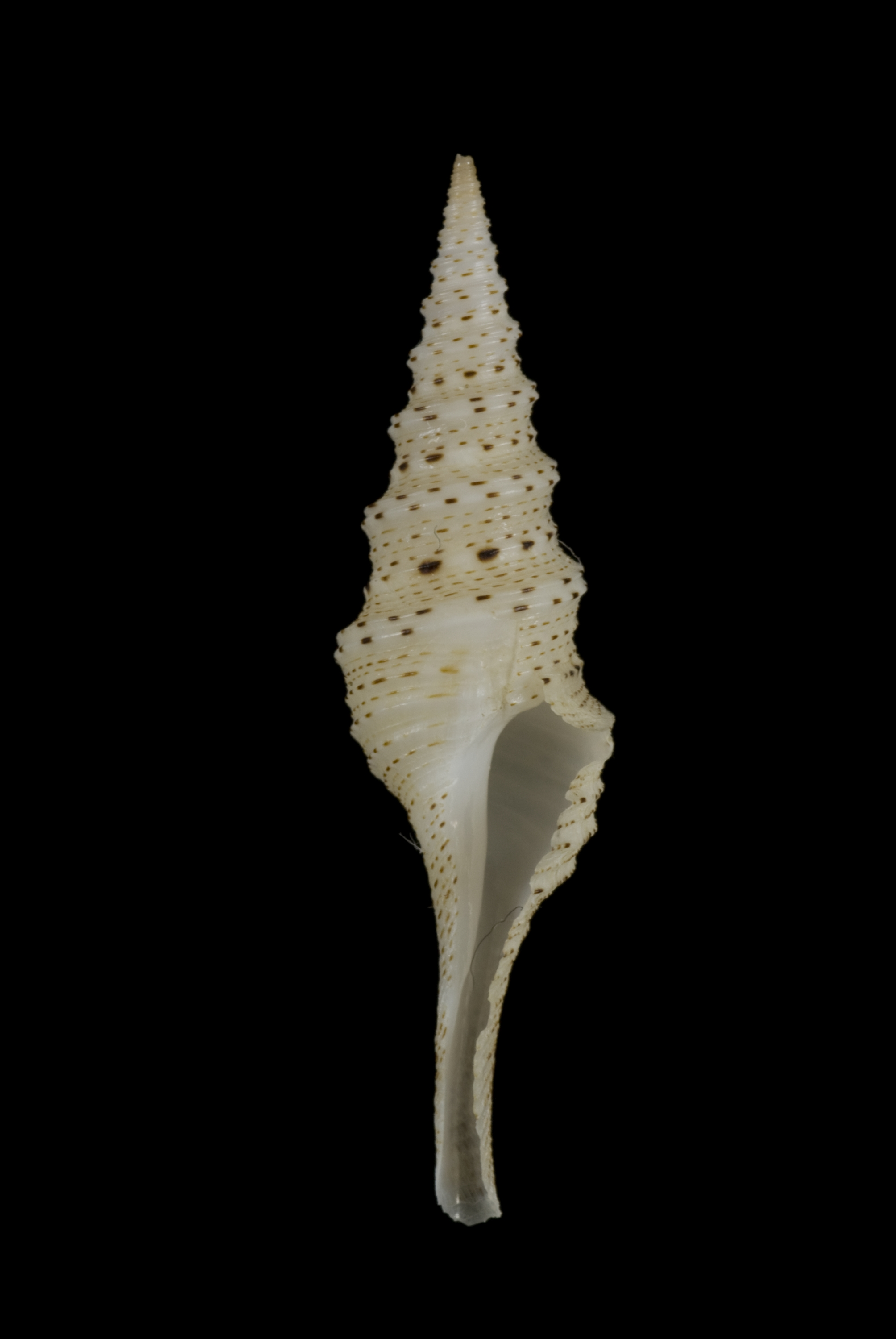
- Shell of Lophiotoma semfala (specimen at MNHN, Paris)

Scientific classification
- Kingdom: Animalia
- Phylum: Mollusca
- Class: Gastropoda
- Subclass: Caenogastropoda
- Order: Neogastropoda
- Superfamily: Conoidea
- Family: Turridae
- Genus: Lophiotoma
- Species: L. semfala

Binomial name
- Lophiotoma semfala Puillandre, Fedosov, Zaharias, Aznar-Cormano & Kantor, 2017

= Lophiotoma semfala =

Species of gastropod

Lophiotoma semfala is a species of sea snail, a marine gastropod mollusk in the family Turridae, the turrids.

== Description ==
The length of the shell attains 35.7 mm. The shell is a pale yellow in color with brown dots lining the shell. The shape of the shell is very slender especially at the bottom where the animal is

== Distribution ==
This marine species occurs off Vanuatu and Papua New Guinea.
