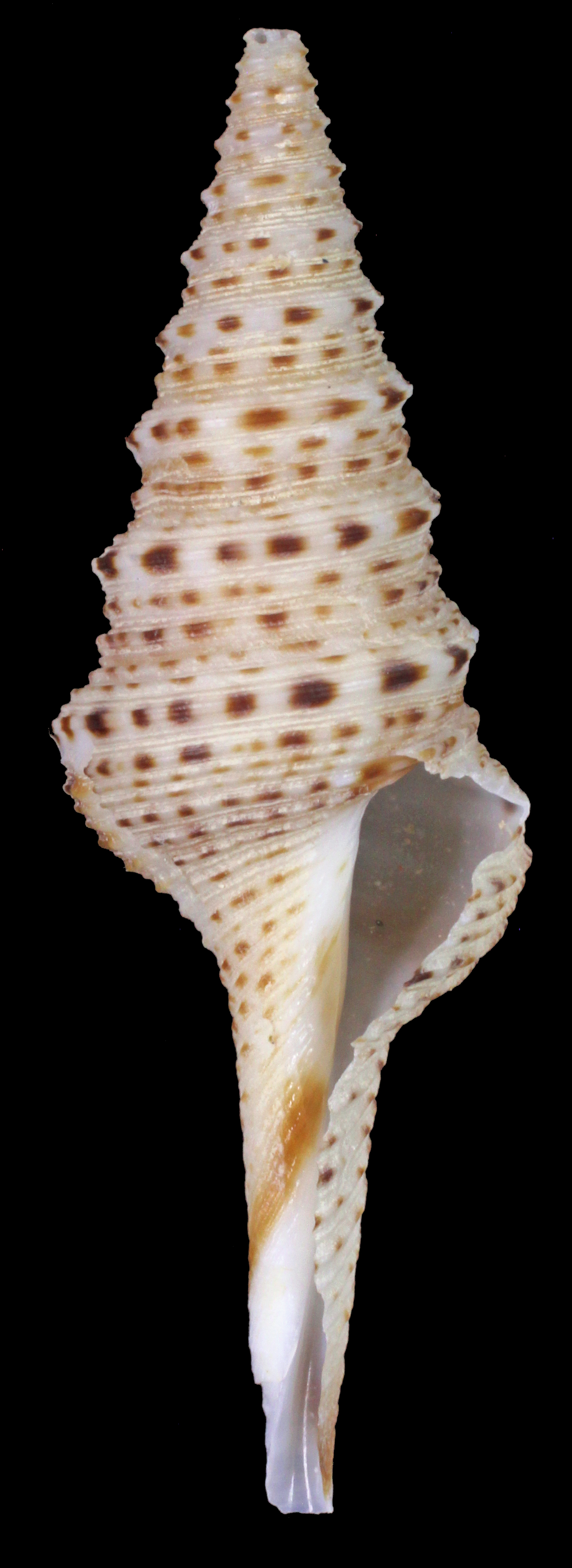
- Shell of Lophiotoma friedrichbonhoefferi (specimen at MNHN, Paris)

Scientific classification
- Kingdom: Animalia
- Phylum: Mollusca
- Class: Gastropoda
- Subclass: Caenogastropoda
- Order: Neogastropoda
- Superfamily: Conoidea
- Family: Turridae
- Genus: Lophiotoma
- Species: L. friedrichbonhoefferi

Binomial name
- Lophiotoma friedrichbonhoefferi Olivera, 2004

Synonyms
- Gemmula (Unedogemmula) friedrichbonhoefferi (Olivera, 2004)

= Lophiotoma friedrichbonhoefferi =

Species of gastropod

Lophiotoma friedrichbonhoefferi is a species of sea snail, a marine gastropod mollusk in the family Turridae, the turrids.

== Description ==
The length of the shell varies between 35 mm and 50 mm.

Members of the species are predators and are benthic.

== Distribution ==
This marine species occurs off the Philippines.
