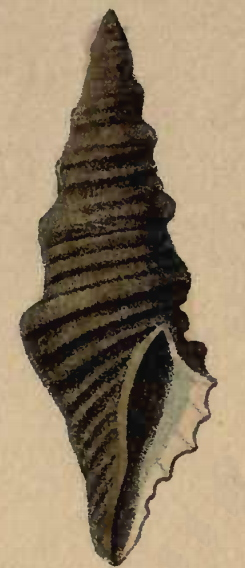
- Shell of Lophiotoma polytropa

Scientific classification
- Kingdom: Animalia
- Phylum: Mollusca
- Class: Gastropoda
- Subclass: Caenogastropoda
- Order: Neogastropoda
- Superfamily: Conoidea
- Family: Turridae
- Genus: Lophiotoma
- Species: L. polytropa

Binomial name
- Lophiotoma polytropa (Helbling, 1779)

Synonyms
- Lophiotoma (Lophioturris) polytropa Helbling, 1779; Lophioturris polytropus (Helbling, 1779); Murex (Fusus) polytropus Helbling, 1779 (basionym); Murex polytropus Helbling, 1779; Pleurotoma elegans Wood, W., 1828; not Blainville, 1829 or Scacchi, 1835; Pleurotoma fascialis Lamarck, 1822

= Lophiotoma polytropa =

Species of gastropod

Lophiotoma polytropa is a species of sea snail, a marine gastropod mollusk in the family Turridae, the turrids.

== Description ==
The length of the shell attains 45 mm, its diameter 18 mm.

The shell is concavely shouldered, forming a somewhat muiltispiral spire, sharply ridged throughout, the two ridges forming the shoulder more prominent. The color of the shell is yellowish to brownish, the ridges dark chestnut. (described as Pleurotoma fascialis)

== Distribution ==
This marine species occurs off the Philippines; the Moluccas and off New Caledonia.
