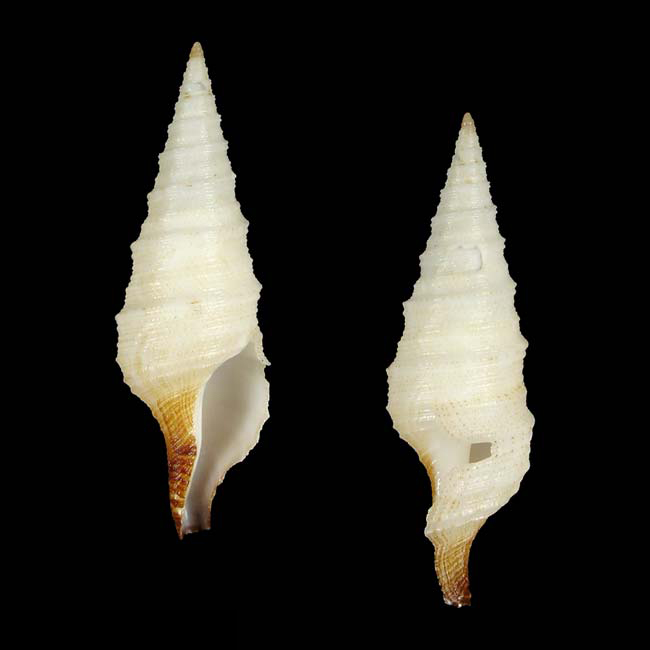
- Shell of Lophiotoma hejingorum

Scientific classification
- Kingdom: Animalia
- Phylum: Mollusca
- Class: Gastropoda
- Subclass: Caenogastropoda
- Order: Neogastropoda
- Superfamily: Conoidea
- Family: Turridae
- Genus: Lophiotoma
- Species: L. hejingorum

Binomial name
- Lophiotoma hejingorum Stahlschmidt, Poppe & Tagaro, 2018

= Lophiotoma hejingorum =

Species of gastropod

Lophiotoma hejingorum is a species of sea snail, a marine gastropod mollusc in the family Turridae.

== Description ==
The length of the shell varies between 22 mm and 32.8 mm.

== Distribution ==
This marine species occurs off Nocnocan Island, Bohol, the Philippines.
