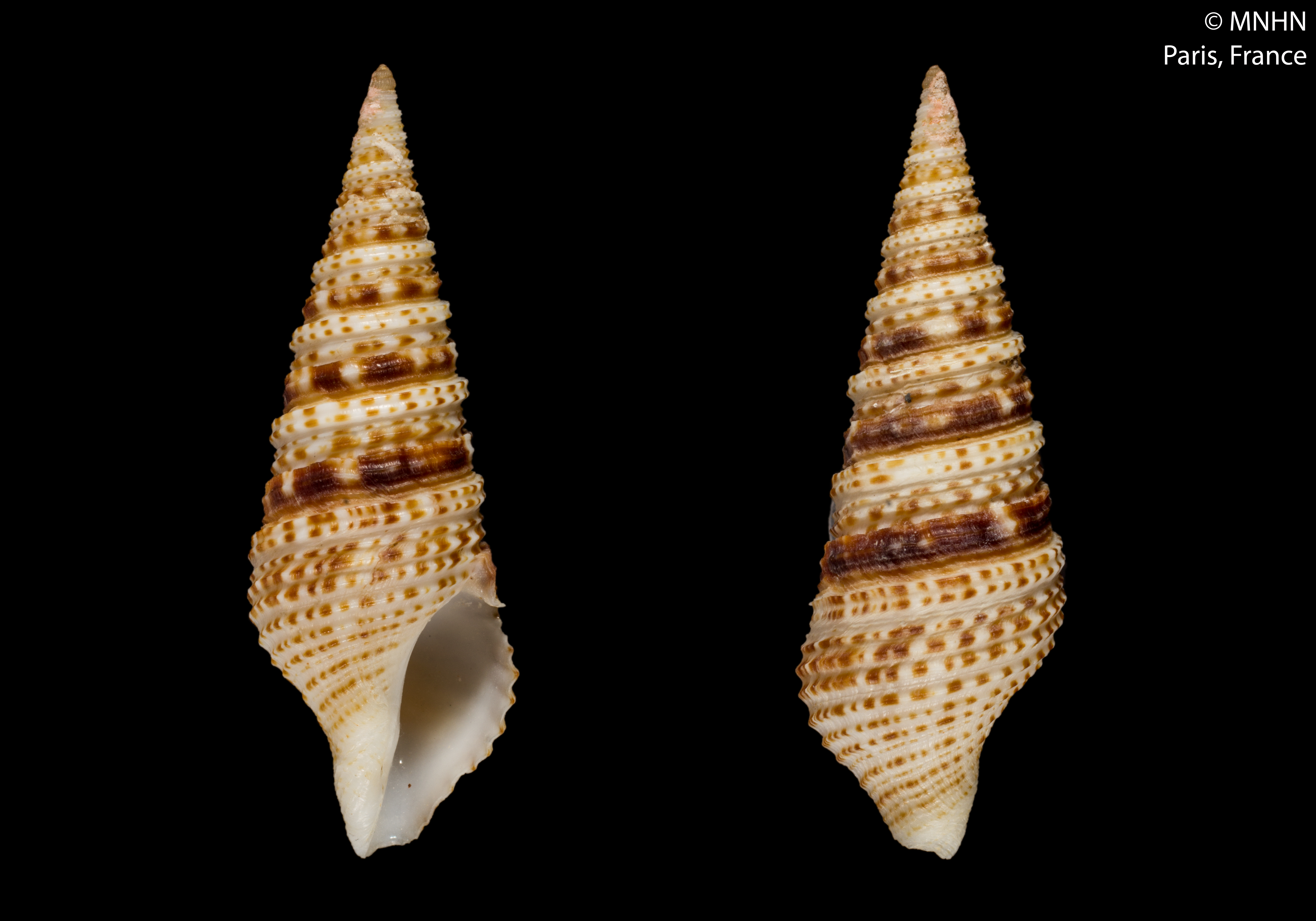
- Shell of Lophiotoma natalensis (holotype at MNHN, Paris)

Scientific classification
- Kingdom: Animalia
- Phylum: Mollusca
- Class: Gastropoda
- Subclass: Caenogastropoda
- Order: Neogastropoda
- Superfamily: Conoidea
- Family: Turridae
- Genus: Lophiotoma
- Species: L. natalensis

Binomial name
- Lophiotoma natalensis Bozzetti, 2016

= Lophiotoma natalensis =

Species of gastropod

Lophiotoma natalensis is a species of sea snail, a marine gastropod mollusk in the family Turridae, the turrids.

== Description ==
The length of the shell attains 32.8 mm.

== Distribution ==
This marine species occurs off KwaZulu-Natal, South Africa
