= Lophiotoma verticala =

Scientific classification
- Kingdom: Animalia
- Phylum: Mollusca
- Class: Gastropoda
- Subclass: Caenogastropoda
- Order: Neogastropoda
- Superfamily: Conoidea
- Family: Turridae
- Genus: Lophiotoma
- Species: L. verticala

Binomial name
- Lophiotoma verticala Baoquan Li & Xinzheng Li, 2008

Species of gastropod

Lophiotoma verticala is a species of sea snail, a marine gastropod mollusk in the family Turridae, the turrids.

== Description ==
The length of the shell attains 15.7 mm, its diameter is 5.9 mm.

== Distribution ==
This species occurs in the China Seas.
