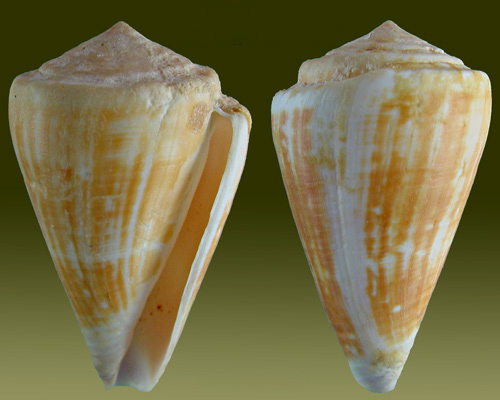
- view of a shell of Conus lischkeanus

Conservation status
- Least Concern (IUCN 3.1)

Scientific classification
- Kingdom: Animalia
- Phylum: Mollusca
- Class: Gastropoda
- Subclass: Caenogastropoda
- Order: Neogastropoda
- Superfamily: Conoidea
- Family: Conidae
- Genus: Conus
- Species: C. lischkeanus

Binomial name
- Conus lischkeanus Weinkauff, 1875

Synonyms
- Calamiconus lischkeanus (Weinkauff, 1875); Conus lischkeanus tropicensis Coomans & Filmer, 1985; Conus okamotoi Kuroda & Itô, 1961; Conus subroseus Röckel & Korn, 1992; Conus tropicensis Coomans & Filmer, 1985; Conus (Lividoconus) lischkeanus Weinkauff, 1875 - accepted, alternate representation; Conus (Rhizoconus) okamotoi ^{Kuroda & Itô, 1961}

= Conus lischkeanus =

Species of sea snail

Conus lischkeanus, the Lischke's cone, is a species of predatory sea snail, a marine gastropod mollusk in the family Conidae, the cone snails, cone shells or cones.

Like all species within the genus Conus, these snails are predatory and venomous. They are capable of stinging humans, therefore live ones should be handled carefully or not at all.

== Description ==
The size of an adult shell varies between 20 mm and 75 mm. The whorls of the spire contain a shallow channel. The body whorl is smooth, striate at the base. The color of the shell is sulphur-yellow, without ornamentation except maculations on the spire. The aperture is white.

== Distribution ==
This marine species occurs off Japan and Taiwan, Queensland, Western Australia, New Zealand, New Caledonia, the Kermadec Islands. There are reported finds from the Philippines and in the Indian Ocean from Natal, South Africa to the Gulf of Aden.

== Gallery ==
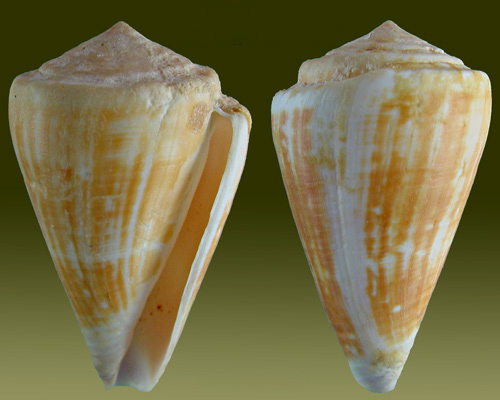
Conus lischkeanus Weinkauff, H.C., 1875

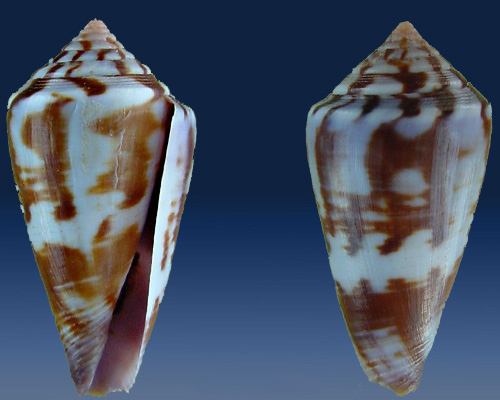
Conus lischkeanus Weinkauff, H.C., 1875
