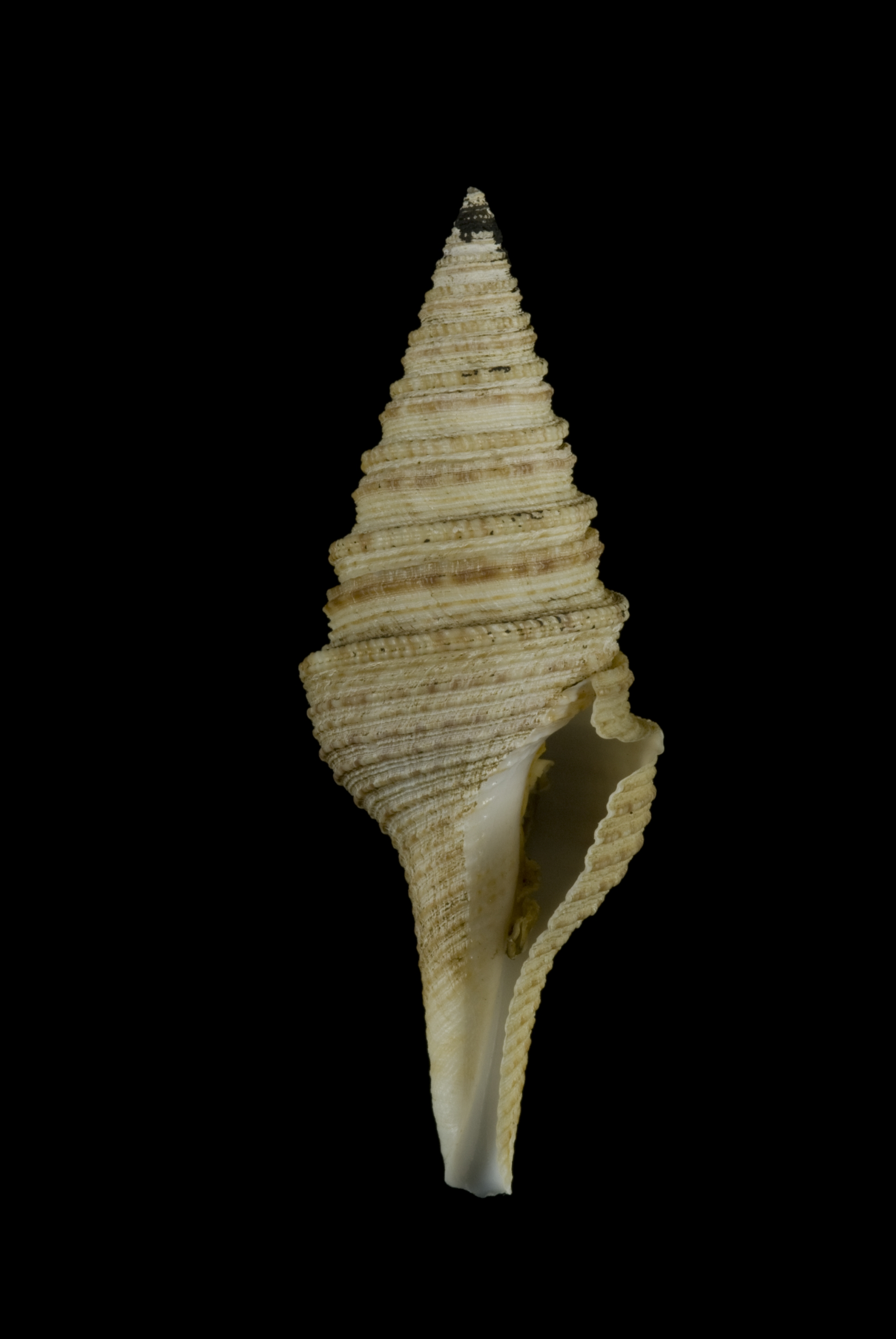
- Shell of Lophiotoma panglaoensis (specimen at MNHN, Paris)

Scientific classification
- Kingdom: Animalia
- Phylum: Mollusca
- Class: Gastropoda
- Subclass: Caenogastropoda
- Order: Neogastropoda
- Superfamily: Conoidea
- Family: Turridae
- Genus: Lophiotoma
- Species: L. panglaoensis

Binomial name
- Lophiotoma panglaoensis Olivera, 2004

= Lophiotoma panglaoensis =

Species of gastropod

Lophiotoma panglaoensis is a species of sea snail, a marine gastropod mollusk in the family Turridae, the turrids.

== Distribution ==
This marine species occurs off Papua New Guinea and Luzon, the Philippines.
