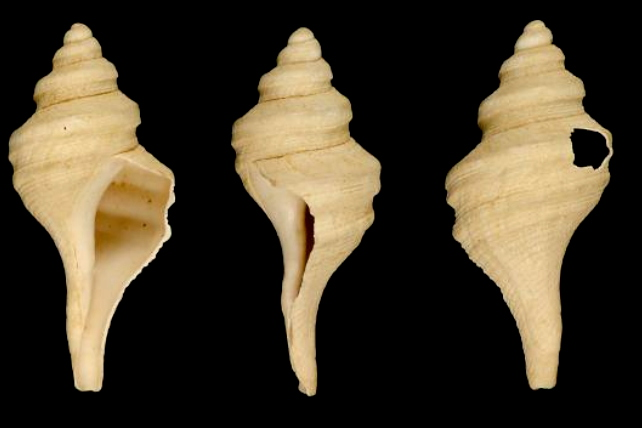
- Shell of Lophiotoma pseudoannulata (holotype at the Smithsonian Institution)

Scientific classification
- Kingdom: Animalia
- Phylum: Mollusca
- Class: Gastropoda
- Subclass: Caenogastropoda
- Order: Neogastropoda
- Superfamily: Conoidea
- Family: Turridae
- Genus: Lophiotoma
- Species: L. pseudoannulata

Binomial name
- Lophiotoma pseudoannulata Dell, 1990

= Lophiotoma pseudoannulata =

Species of gastropod

Lophiotoma pseudoannulata is a species of sea snail, a marine gastropod mollusk in the family Turridae, the turrids.

== Description ==
The length of the shell attains 20 mm.

== Distribution ==
This species occurs in the Ross Sea, Antarctica at a depth of 1,890 m.
