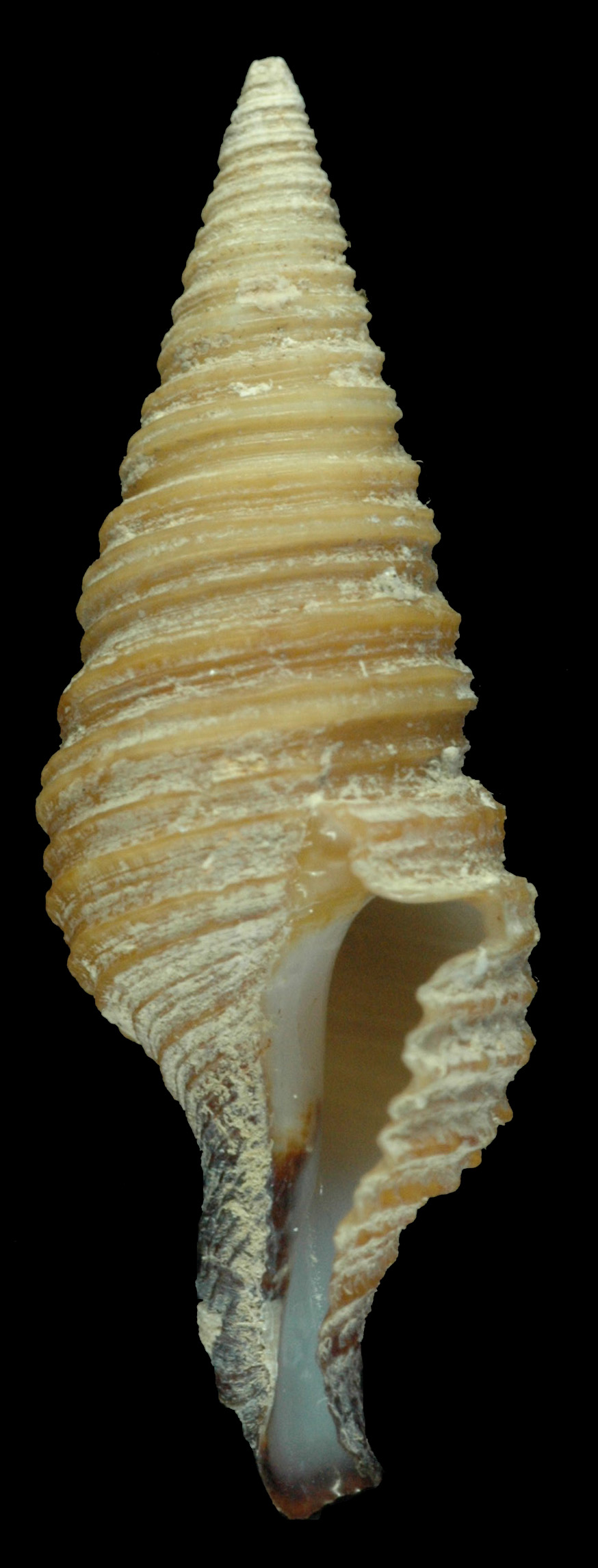
- Shell of Lophiotoma brevicaudata (specimen at MNHN, Paris)

Scientific classification
- Kingdom: Animalia
- Phylum: Mollusca
- Class: Gastropoda
- Subclass: Caenogastropoda
- Order: Neogastropoda
- Superfamily: Conoidea
- Family: Turridae
- Genus: Lophiotoma
- Species: L. brevicaudata

Binomial name
- Lophiotoma brevicaudata (Reeve, 1843)

Synonyms
- Lophiotoma (Lophiotoma) brevicaudata (Reeve, 1843); Pleurotoma (Surcula) brevicaudata Reeve, 1843; Turris brevicaudata (Reeve, 1843); Turris (Surcula) brevicaudata (Reeve, 1843)

= Lophiotoma brevicaudata =

Species of gastropod

Lophiotoma brevicaudata is a species of sea snail, a marine gastropod mollusk in the family Turridae, the turrids.

== Description ==
The length of the shell varies between 16 mm and 24 mm.

The shell is concavely shouldered, forming a somewhat multispiral spire, sharply ridged throughout. The two ridges form the shoulder more prominent; yellowish to brownish. The ridges are dark chestnut.

== Distribution ==
This marine species occurs off Papua New Guinea, Queensland, Australia and the Philippines.
