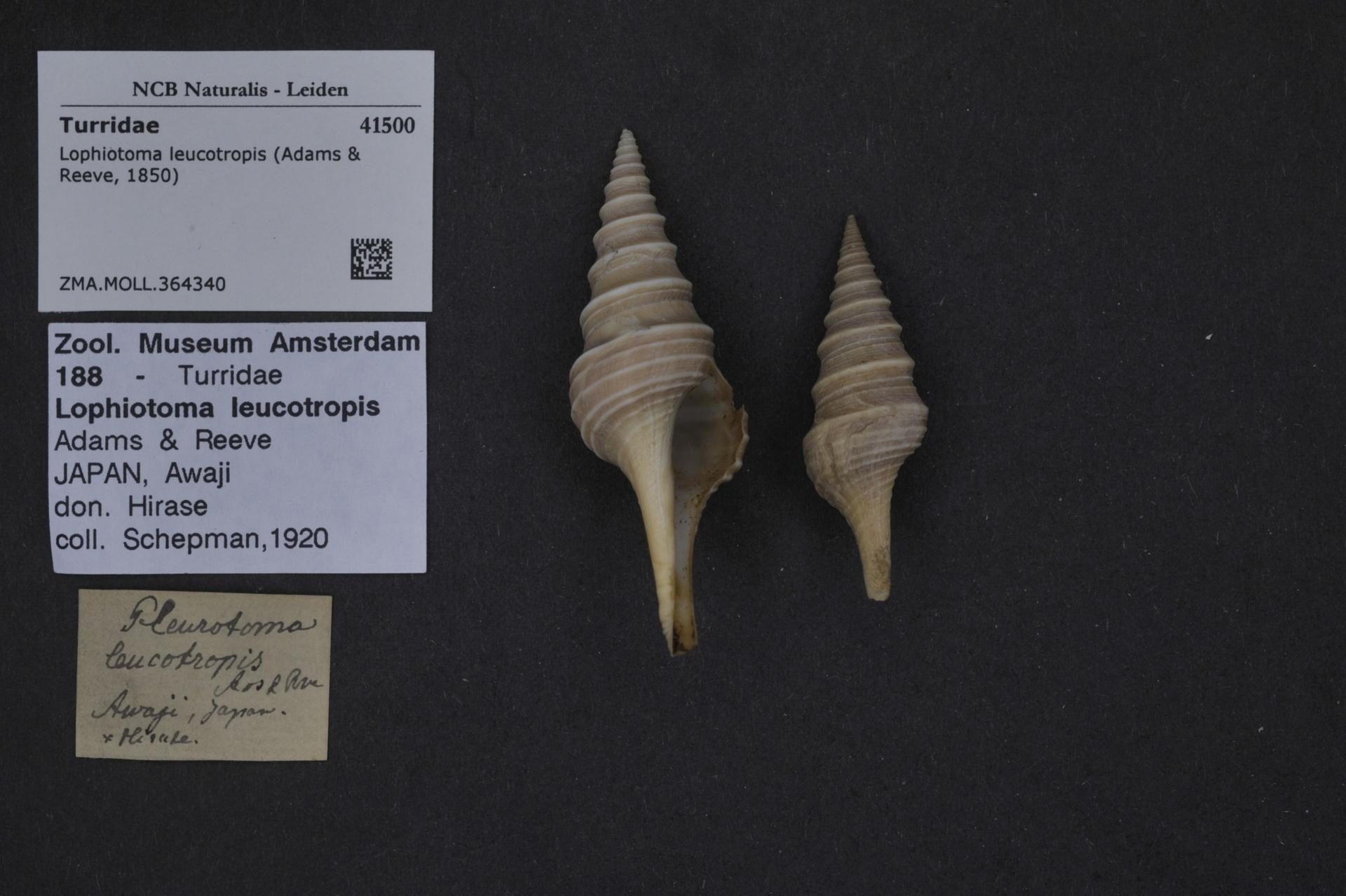
- Shell of Lophiotoma leucotropis (specimen at Naturalis, Leiden)

Scientific classification
- Kingdom: Animalia
- Phylum: Mollusca
- Class: Gastropoda
- Subclass: Caenogastropoda
- Order: Neogastropoda
- Superfamily: Conoidea
- Family: Turridae
- Genus: Lophiotoma
- Species: L. leucotropis

Binomial name
- Lophiotoma leucotropis (A. Adams & Reeve, 1850)

Synonyms
- Lophioturris leucotropis (A. Adams & Reeve, 1850); Pleurotoma leucotropis A. Adams & Reeve, 1850 (original combination)

= Lophiotoma leucotropis =

Species of gastropod

Lophiotoma leucotropis, common name the light-wine turrid, is a species of sea snail, a marine gastropod mollusk in the family Turridae, the turrids.

== Description ==
The length of the shell varies between 35 mm and 75 mm.

The fusiform shell is slightly swollen in the middle. It contains 11 whorls with fine striae. The whorls are concave above and acutely carinated. The lower part of the body whorl is bicarinate and has a wide sinus. This species is distinguished by the broad slanting concavity round the upper part of the whorls, and its prominent central keel.

== Distribution ==
This marine species occurs off the Philippines; in the Yellow Sea, East China Sea and South China Sea; and off and Japan.
