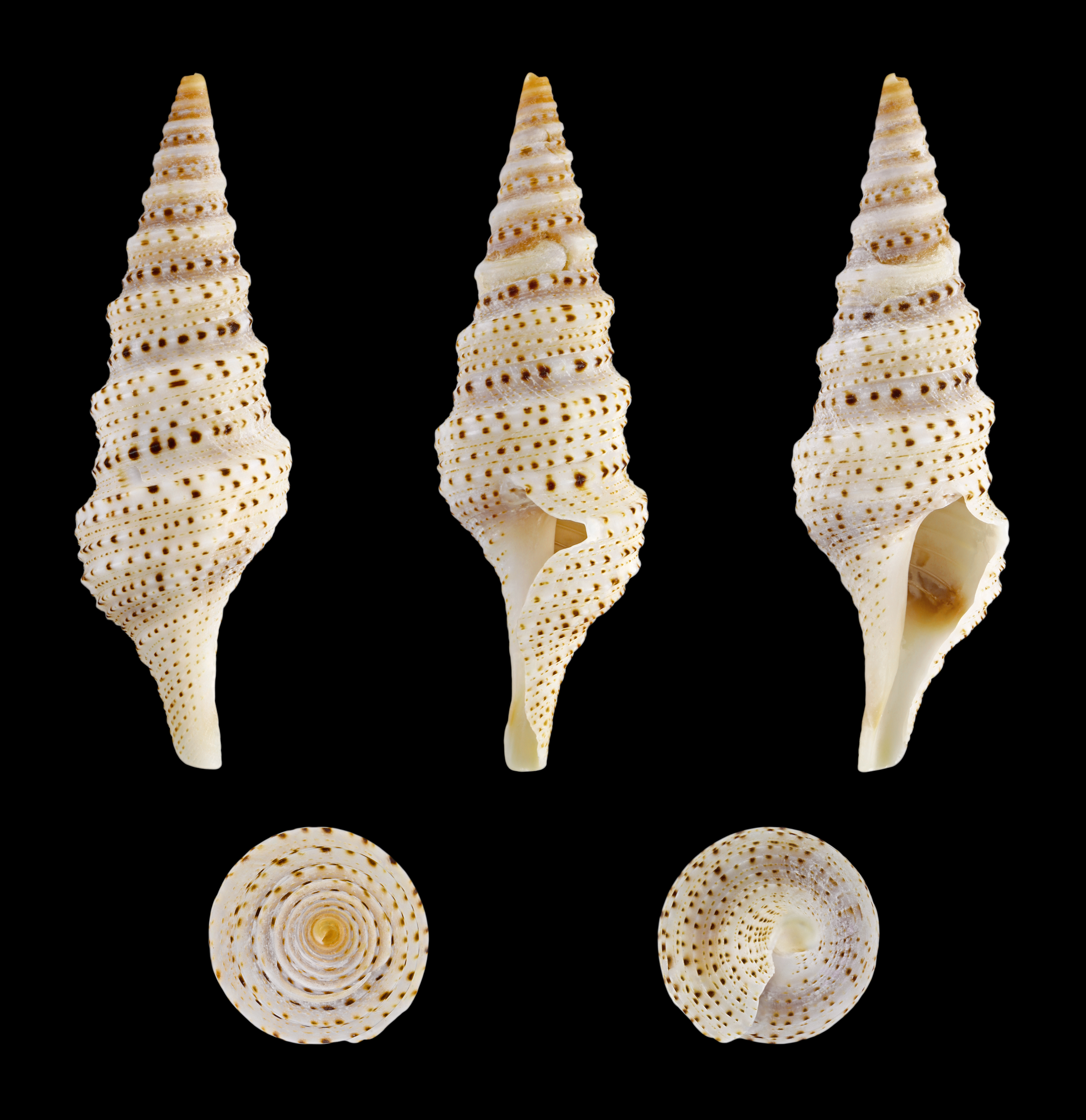
- Shell of Lophiotoma acuta

Scientific classification
- Kingdom: Animalia
- Phylum: Mollusca
- Class: Gastropoda
- Subclass: Caenogastropoda
- Order: Neogastropoda
- Superfamily: Conoidea
- Family: Turridae
- Genus: Lophiotoma
- Species: L. acuta

Binomial name
- Lophiotoma acuta (Perry, 1811)

Synonyms
- Lophiotoma (Lophiotoma) notata Sowerby, G.B. III, 1889; Lophiotoma (Lophiotoma) tigrina Lamarck, J.B.P.A. de, 1822; Lophiotoma microsticta Casey, T.L., 1904; Lophiotoma tigrina (Lamarck, 1822); Pleurotoma acuta PerryG., 1811; Pleurotoma jickelii Weinkauff, H.C. & W. Kobelt, 1875; Pleurotoma marmorata Lamarck, 1816 (invalid: junior homonym of Pleurotoma marmorata Link, 1807; Pleurotoma tigrina Lamarck, 1822 is a replacement name); Pleurotoma picturata Weinkauff, H.C. & W. Kobelt, 1876; Pleurotoma punctata Schubert, H.G. & A.J. Wagner, 1829; Pleurotoma tigrina Lamarck, 1822; Pleurotoma variegata Reeve, L.A., 1843; Turris acuta (Perry, 1811); Turris marmorata (J.B.P.A. Lamarck, 1816); Turris peaseana Dunker, R.W., 1871; Turris tigrina (Lamarck, 1822)

= Lophiotoma acuta =

Species of gastropod

Lophiotoma acuta, commonly known as the marbled turrid, is a species of sea snail, a marine gastropod mollusk in the family Turridae, the turrids.

== Description ==
The length of an adult shell varies between 30 mm and 90 mm.

The narrow, fusiform shell has a high, acute spire and is less carinated and has more rounded revolving ribs than other species in this genus. The shell contains 13 whorls of which three in the protoconch. The convex whorls are transversely sulcated. They are obscurely grained and ornamented round the upper half with a double zone or belt. The long siphonal canal is slightly reclined to the left. The shallow sutures are characterized by large spots and smaller ones elsewhere, coalescing into longitudinal, undulated streaks.

== Distribution ==
This marine species occurs in the Red Sea, in the Indian Ocean, and in the Indo-West Pacific along with the Philippines, Vanuatu, Japan and Hong Kong.
