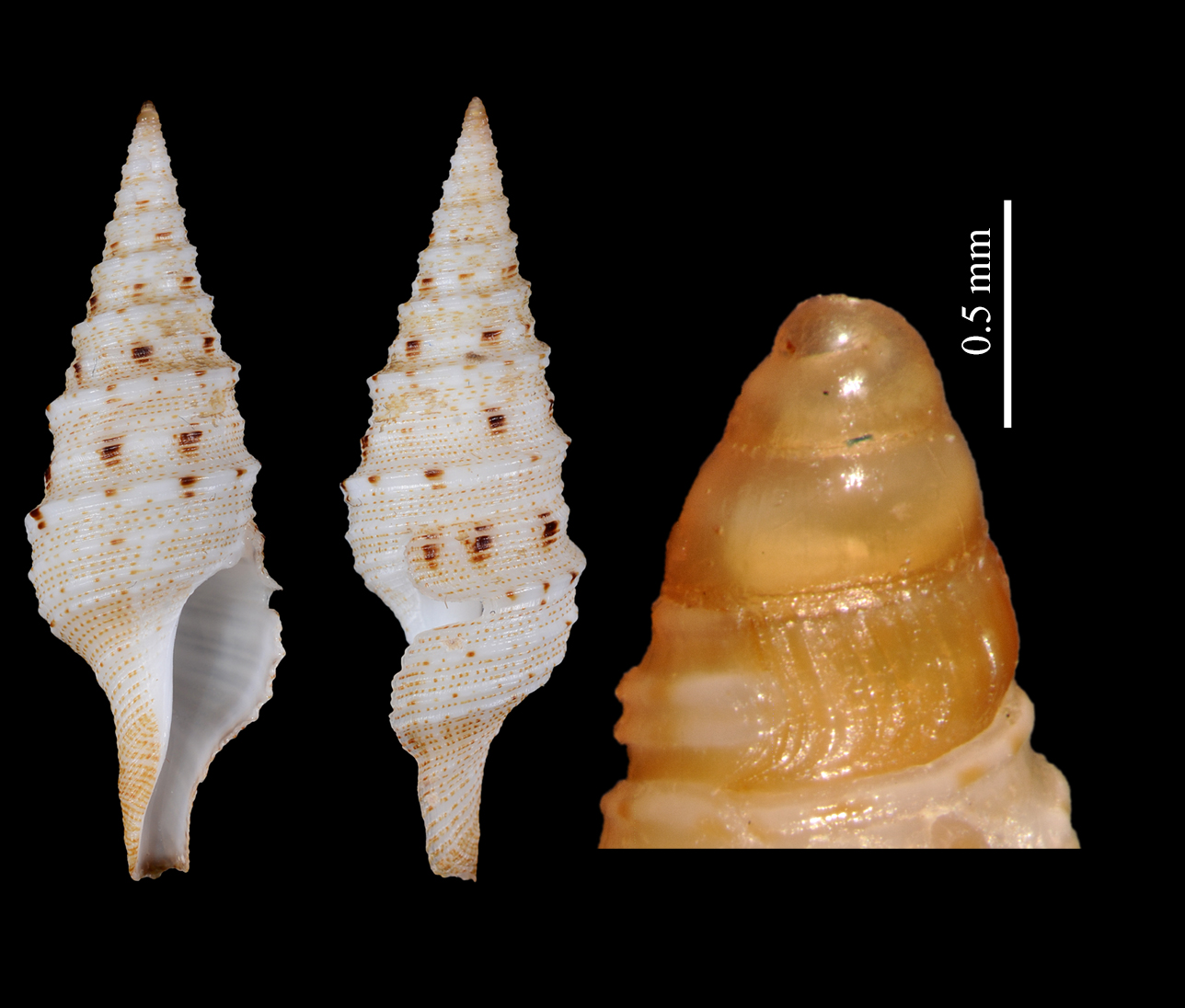
- Shell of Lophiotoma bratasusa (holotype at MNHN, Paris)

Scientific classification
- Kingdom: Animalia
- Phylum: Mollusca
- Class: Gastropoda
- Subclass: Caenogastropoda
- Order: Neogastropoda
- Superfamily: Conoidea
- Family: Turridae
- Genus: Lophiotoma
- Species: L. bratasusa

Binomial name
- Lophiotoma bratasusa Puillandre, Fedosov, Zaharias, Aznar-Cormano & Kantor, 2017

= Lophiotoma bratasusa =

Species of gastropod

Lophiotoma bratasusa is a species of sea snail, a marine gastropod mollusk in the family Turridae, the turrids.

== Description ==
The length of the shell attains 26 mm.

== Distribution ==
This marine species occurs off Papua New Guinea.
