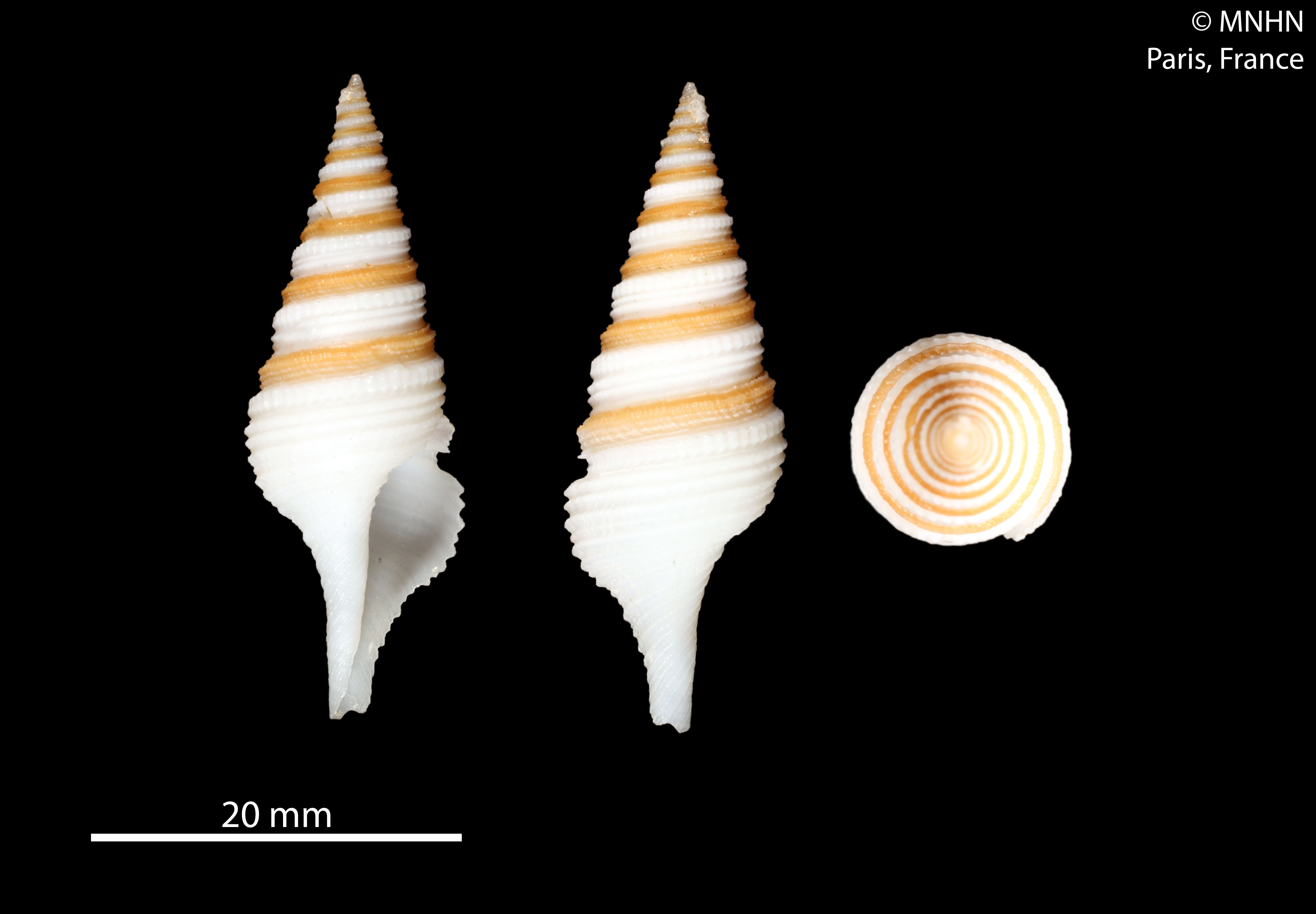
- Shell of Anisogemmula ambara (paratype at MNHN, Paris)

Scientific classification
- Kingdom: Animalia
- Phylum: Mollusca
- Class: Gastropoda
- Subclass: Caenogastropoda
- Order: Neogastropoda
- Superfamily: Conoidea
- Family: Turridae
- Genus: Anisogemmula
- Species: A. ambara

Binomial name
- Anisogemmula ambara (B. M. Olivera, Hillyard & Watkins, 2008)

Synonyms
- Gemmula ambara B. M. Olivera, Hillyard & Watkins, 2008 superseded combination

= Anisogemmula ambara =

Species of gastropod

Anisogemmula ambara is a species of sea snail, a marine gastropod mollusc in the family Turridae, the turrids.

== Description ==
The length of the shell varies between 30 mm and 60 mm.

== Distribution ==
This marine species occurs off the Philippines; Guadalcanal; Chilwei Island, East China Sea.
