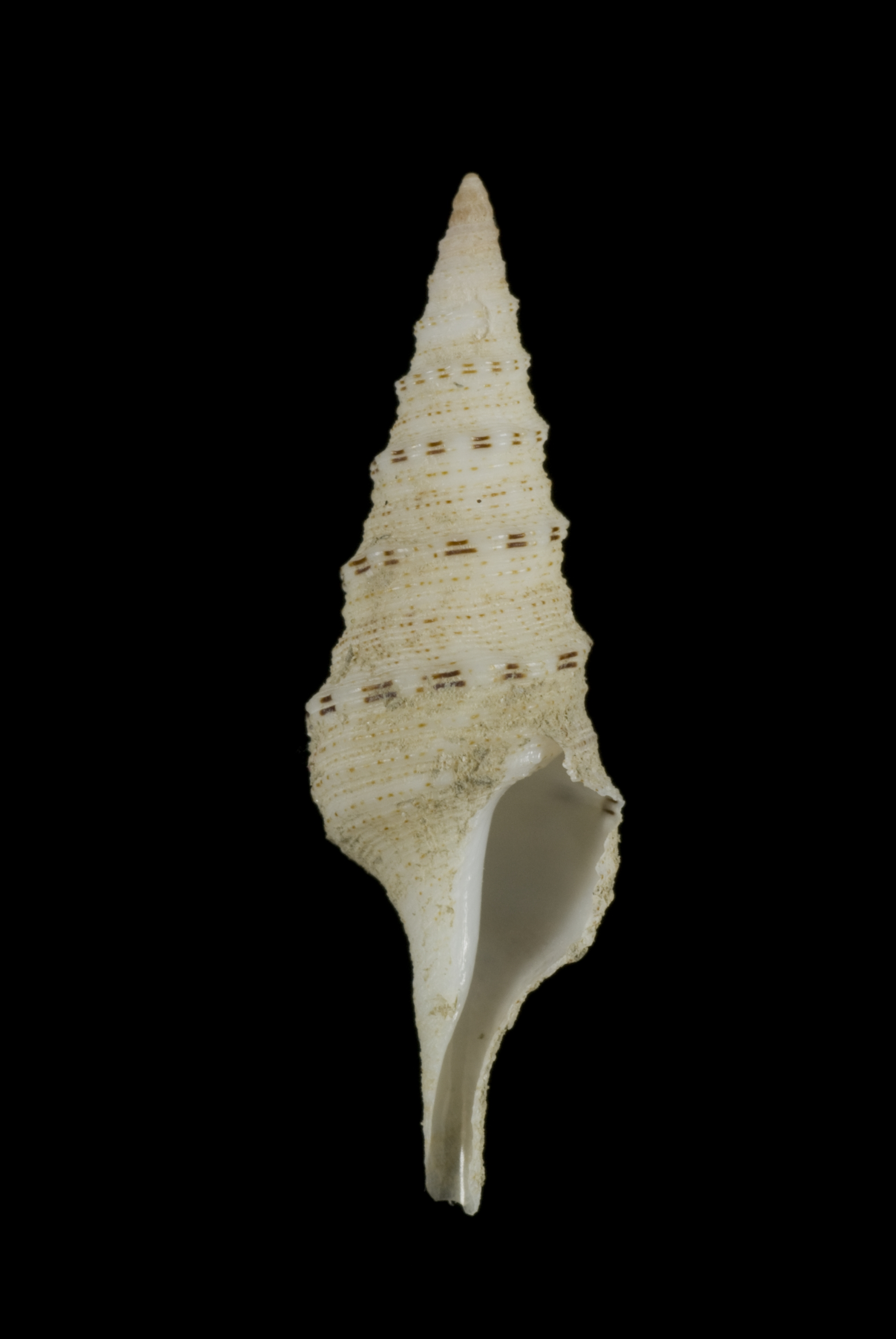
- Shell of Anisogemmula albina (specimen at MNHN, Paris)

Scientific classification
- Kingdom: Animalia
- Phylum: Mollusca
- Class: Gastropoda
- Subclass: Caenogastropoda
- Order: Neogastropoda
- Superfamily: Conoidea
- Family: Turridae
- Genus: Anisogemmula
- Species: A. albina

Binomial name
- Anisogemmula albina (Lamarck, 1822)

Synonyms
- Gemmula albina (Lamarck, 1822) superseded combination; Lophiotoma albina (Lamarck, 1822); Pleurotoma albina Lamarck, 1822 (original combination)

= Anisogemmula albina =

Species of gastropod

Anisogemmula albina is a species of sea snail, a marine gastropod mollusk in the family Turridae, the turrids.

== Description ==
The keel-rib is flattened, bearing a row of equidistant, somewhat quadrangular brown spots. The rest of the surface is very minutely and numerously punctate with brown.

The conspicuous painting on the slit-band, contrasted with the very minute sprinkling of brown dots elsewhere, is the distinguishing characteristic of this species.

== Distribution ==
This marine species occurs off Papua New Guinea.
