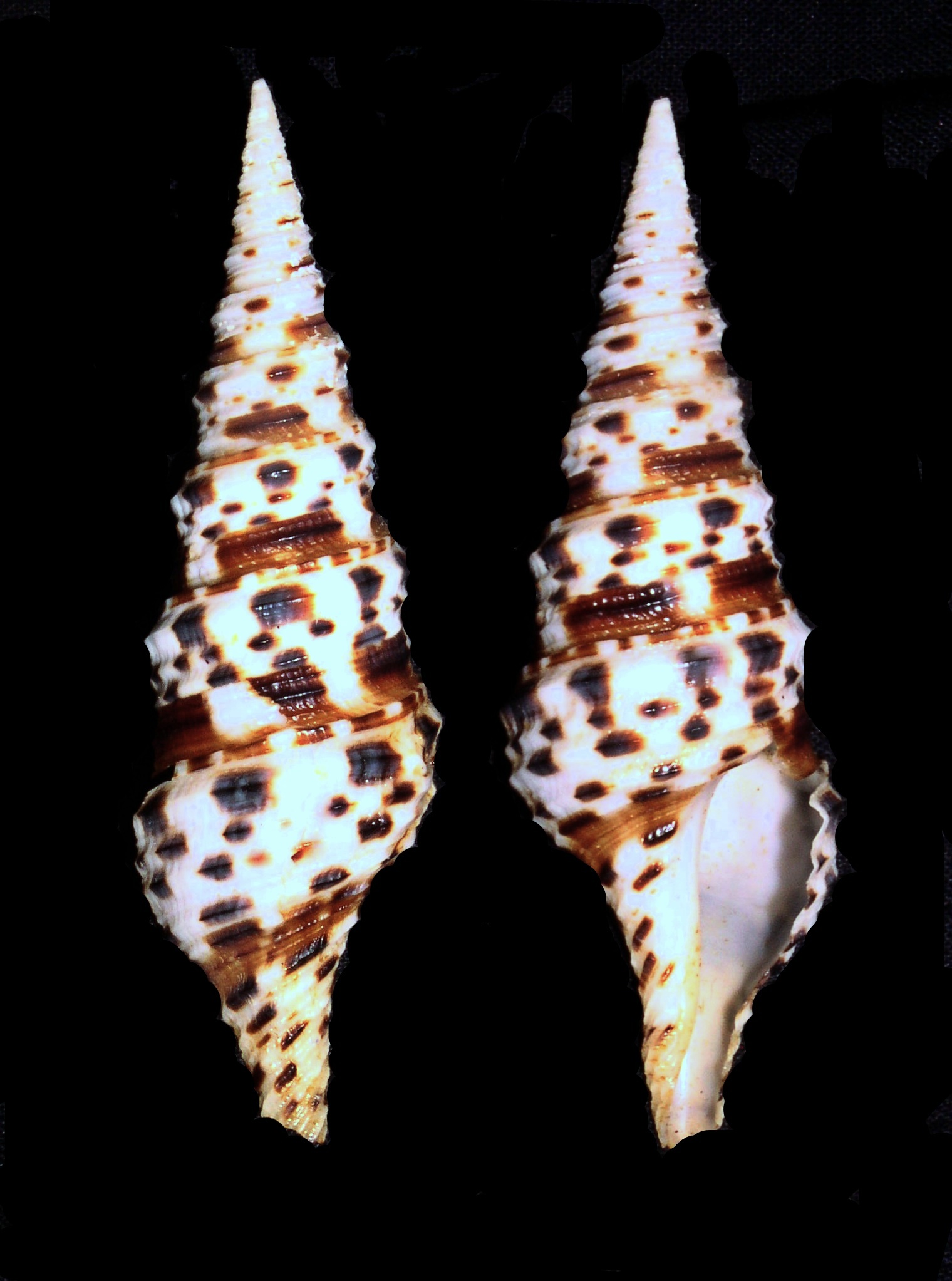
- A shell of Turris babylonia

Scientific classification
- Kingdom: Animalia
- Phylum: Mollusca
- Class: Gastropoda
- Subclass: Caenogastropoda
- Order: Neogastropoda
- Family: Turridae
- Genus: Turris
- Species: T. babylonia

Binomial name
- Turris babylonia (Linnaeus, 1758)

Synonyms
- Lophiotoma babylonia (Linnaeus, 1758); Murex babylonius Linnaeus, 1758 (original combination); Turris assyria Olivera, Seronay & Fedosov, 2010; Turris imperfecti Röding, 1798; Turris nobilis Röding, 1798; Turris pulchra Röding, 1798; Turris raffrayi C.M. Tapparone-Canefri, 1878; Turris tornatum Röding, 1798

= Turris babylonia =

Species of gastropod

Turris babylonia, common name: the Babylon turrid or tower turrid, is a species of sea snail, a marine gastropod mollusk in the family Turridae, the turrids.

== Synonyms ==
- Lophiotoma babylonia (Linnaeus, 1758)
- Murex babylonius Linne, 1758
- Pleurotoma babylonia Linnaeus, 1758
- Pleurotoma raffrayi Tapparone-Canefri, C.E., 1878
- Turris assyria Olivera, Seronay & Fedosov, 2010
- Turris imperfecti Röding, 1798
- Turris nobilis Röding, 1798
- Turris pulchra Röding, 1798
- Turris tornatum Röding, 1798

== Distribution ==
This species occurs in the Pacific Ocean off the Philippines, Indonesia, the Solomon Islands, Papua New Guinea, Timor; in the Indian Ocean off Mauritius and the Mascarene Basin.

== Description ==
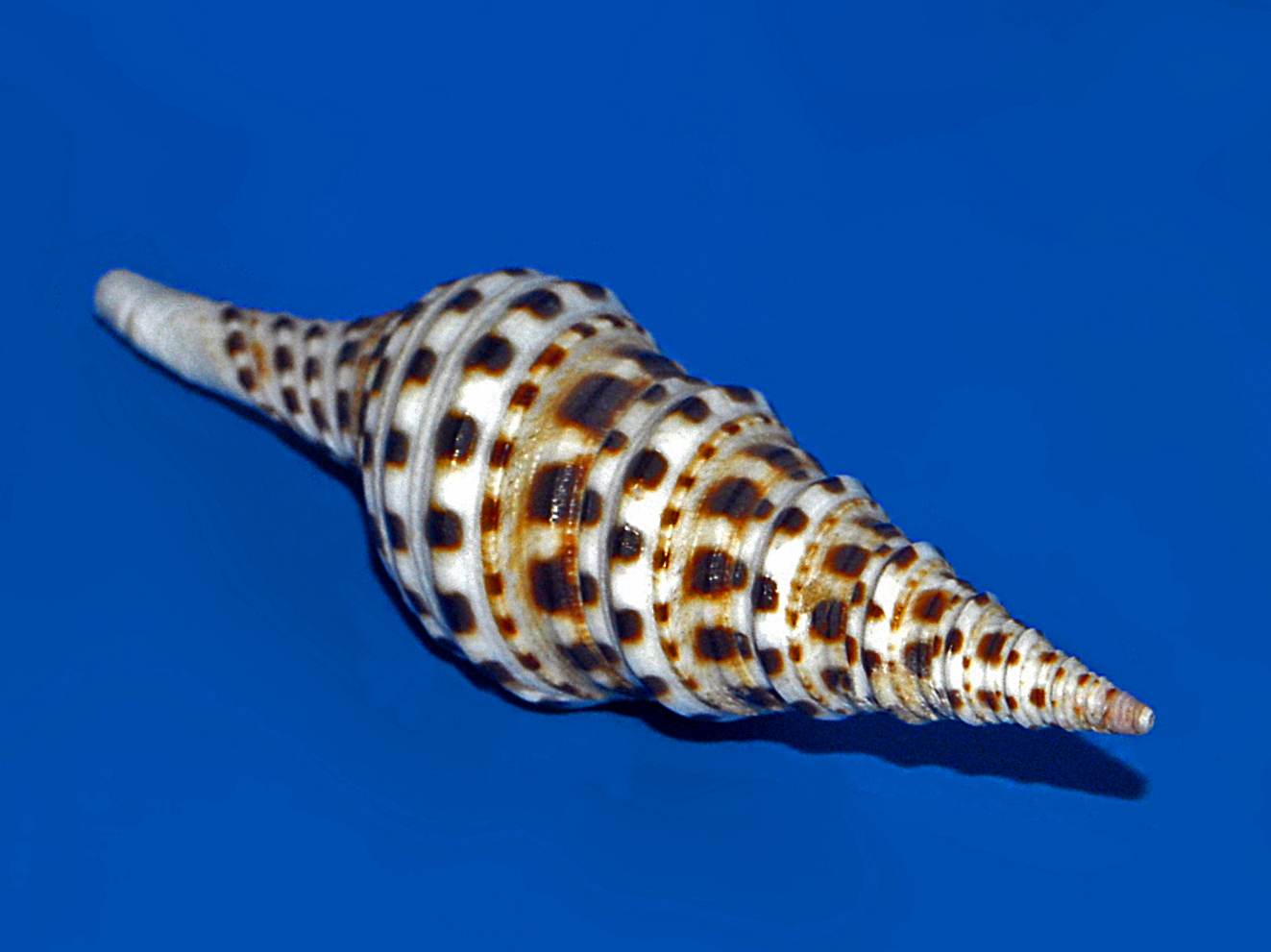
A shell of Turris babylonia from Philippines

The size of an adult shell varies between 63 mm and 100 mm. The shell shows somewhat angular whorls, caused by the greater prominence of one of the revolving ribs. Its sculpture shows large revolving ribs, with intermediate raised lines. The color of the shell is whitish, with large dark brown or nearly black spots upon the ribs.

== Habitat ==
These tropical benthic gastropods can be found in subtidal zone on rocks and sand.

== Biology ==
Embryos of Turris babylonia develop into free-swimming planktonic marine larvae (trochophore) and later into juvenile veligers. Adults feed on marine worms chased by means of their venom, similarly to the cone snails.

== Bibliography ==
- Drivas, J. & M. Jay (1988). Coquillages de La Réunion et de l'île Maurice
- Rosenberg, G. 1992. Encyclopedia of Seashells. Dorset: New York. 224 pp. page(s): 103
- Olivera B.M., Seronay R.A. & Fedosov A.E. (2010) Turris babylonia; re-evaluation of a species complex and description of Turris assyria, new species. Philippine Science Letters 3:46–58
- Kilburn R.N., Fedosov A.E. & Olivera B.M. (2012) Revision of the genus Turris Batsch, 1789 (Gastropoda: Conoidea: Turridae) with the description of six new species. Zootaxa 3244: 1–58.
