= Heinrich Conrad Weinkauff =

German zoologist and malacologist

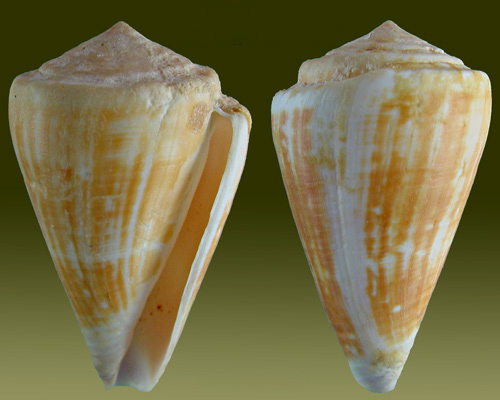
Conus lischkeanus described by Weinkauff in 1875

Heinrich Conrad Weinkauff (1817–1886) was a German zoologist and malacologist. Weinkauff described many new species.

== Works ==
Partial list

- Weinkauff H. C., 1867-1868: Die Conchylien des Mittelmeeres, ihre geographische und geologisches Verbreitung; T. Fischer, Cassel, Vol. 1: pp. XIX + 307 [1867]. Vol. 2: pp. VI + 512. [1868] pdf
- Weinkauff, H.C., 1872. Ein Streiflicht aus unsere Kenntniss der geographischen verbreitung des Meeres-mollusken. Nachr. Deutsch. Malak. Ges., 2: 33-43.
- Weinkauff, H.C. 1874. Catalog der bis bekannt gewordenen Arten der Gattung Conus L. Jahrbücher der Deutschen Malakozoologischen Gesellschaft 1: 236-268, 273-305
- Weinkauff, H.C. 1875. Conus. pp. 311–316 in Küster, H.C., Martini, F.W. & Chemnitz, J.H. (eds). Systematisches Conchylien-Cabinet von Martini und Chemnitz. Nürnberg : Bauer & Raspe Vol. 4.
- Weinkauff, H.C. 1876. Das Genus Pleurotoma. pp. 49–136 in Küster, H.C., Martini, F.W. & Chemnitz, J.H. (eds). Systematisches Conchylien-Cabinet von Martini und Chemnitz. Nürnberg : Bauer & Raspe Vol. 4.
- Weinkauff H.C., 1878 Die Gattung Oliva Systematisches Conchylien Cabinet von Martini und Chemnitz, Vol. 5 Abt. 1). Bauer & Raspe, Nürnberg

Note Conchylien-Cabinet von Martini und Chemnitz is an enormous work published from 1837 up to 1920 with nearly one hundred sections, including some 4000 plates. The original work was continued by Heinrich Carl Küster and then Wilhelm Kobelt and Weinkauff.
