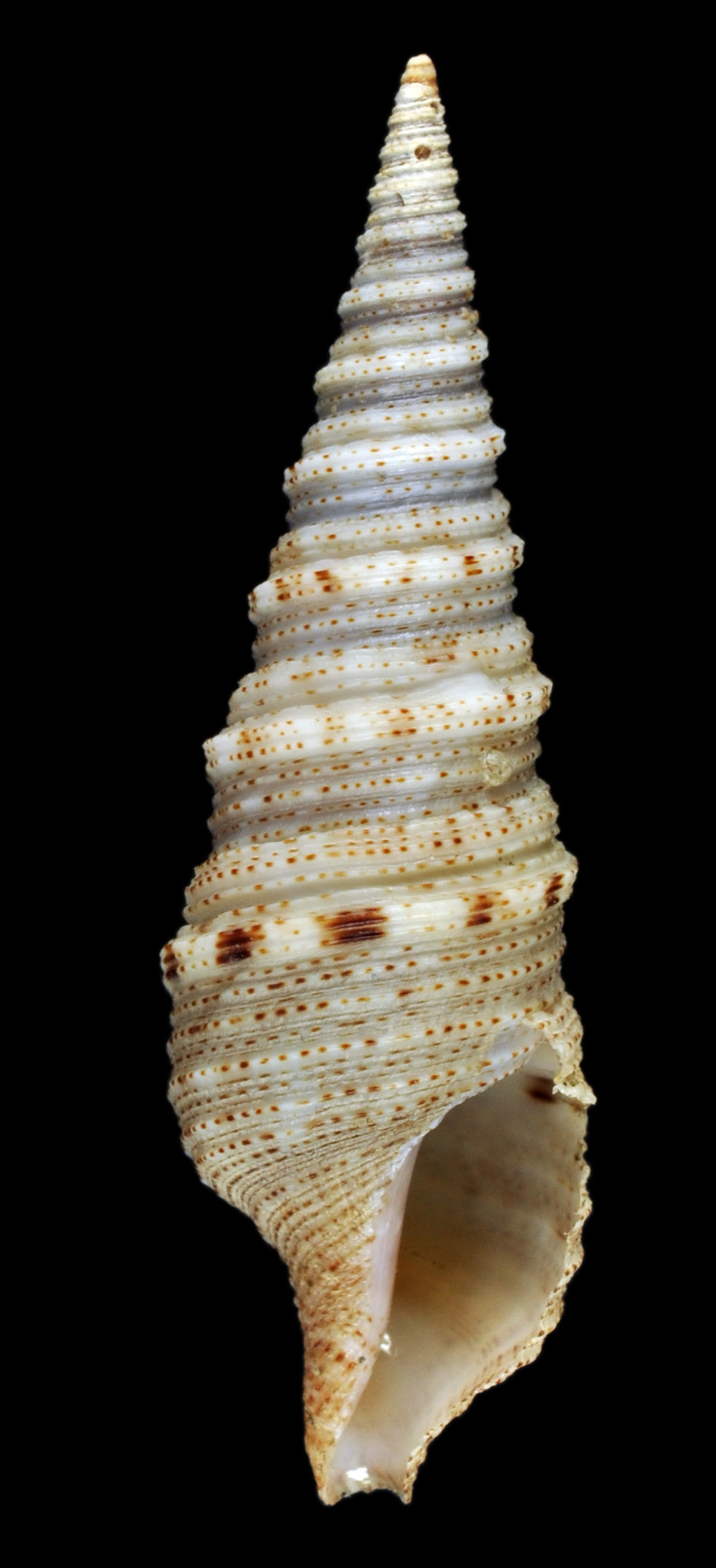
- Shell of Xenuroturris legitima (specimen at MNHN, Paris)

Scientific classification
- Kingdom: Animalia
- Phylum: Mollusca
- Class: Gastropoda
- Subclass: Caenogastropoda
- Order: Neogastropoda
- Superfamily: Conoidea
- Family: Turridae
- Genus: Xenuroturris; Iredale, 1929

Synonyms
- Clamturris Iredale, 1931; Lophiotoma (Xenuroturris) Iredale, 1929

= Xenuroturris =

Genus of gastropods

Xenuroturris also known as Iotyrris is a genus of sea snails, marine gastropod mollusks in the family Turridae, the turrids.

== Description ==
This genus characterized by a polygonal protoconch. The anterior siphonal canal is relatively short. The sinus rib is margined.

== Taxonomy ==
The genus Iotyrris was synonymized with Xenuroturris in 2024 following a comprehensive phylogenetic revision of the family Turridae. Iotyrris had originally been distinguished from Xenuroturris based on radular morphology; while species of Xenuroturris were characterized by "duplex" marginal radular teeth, those assigned to Iotyrris possessed "semi-enrolled" marginal teeth.

However, molecular analyses utilizing exon-capture data demonstrated that these radular traits were homoplastic and not consistent with the phylogeny. The study found that species possessing duplex teeth (such as X. olangoensis, X. kingae, and X. notata) fell into the same well-supported clade as species with semi-enrolled teeth. Because the radular morphology was found to lack diagnostic value at the generic level, Iotyrris was reduced to a synonym of Xenuroturris.

== Distribution ==
This marine genus occurs in the Red Sea and extends from the tropical Indian Ocean to the tropical Pacific Ocean as far east as Hawaii; also off Australia (Queensland) and Mozambique in the Western Pacific Ocean.

== Species ==
Species within the genus Xenuroturris include:

- †Xenuroturris antiselli (F. Anderson & B. Martin, 1914)
- Xenuroturris castanellus Powell, 1964
- Xenuroturris emmae Bozzetti, 1993
- Xenuroturris legitima Iredale, 1929
- Xenuroturris millepunctata (Sowerby III, 1908)Species within the former genus Iotyrris include:
- Iotyrris cerithiformis (Powell, 1964)
- Iotyrris cingulifera (Lamarck, 1822)
- Iotyrris conotaxis Abdelkrim, Aznar-Cormano, Buge, Fedosov, Kantor, Zaharias & Puillandre, 2018
- Iotyrris devoizei Kantor et al., 2008
- Iotyrris kingae (Powell, 1964)
- Iotyrris marquesensis Sysoev, 2002
- Iotyrris musivum Kantor et al., 2008
- Iotyrris notata (G. B. Sowerby III, 1889)
- Iotyrris olangoensis (Olivera, 2002)

Synonyms

- † Xenuroturris bisculptus Powell, 1944: synonym of † Veruturris bisculptus (Powell, 1944)
- Xenuroturris cerithiformis Powell, 1964: synonym of Iotyrris cerithiformis (Powell, 1964)
- Xenuroturris cingulifera (Lamarck, 1822): synonym of Iotyrris cingulifera (Lamarck, 1822)
- † Xenuroturris cochleatus Powell, 1944: synonym of † Veruturris cochleatus (Powell, 1944)
- Xenuroturris corona Laseron, 1954: synonym of Typhlomangelia corona (Laseron, 1954) (original combination)
- Xenuroturris gemmuloides Powell, 1967: synonym of Pseudogemmula gemmuloides (A. W. B. Powell, 1967)
- Xenuroturris kingae Powell, 1964: synonym of Iotyrris kingae (Powell, 1964) (original combination)
- † Xenuroturris quadricarinatus Powell, 1944: synonym of † Veruturris quadricarinatus (Powell, 1944)
- † Xenuroturris subconcavus (G.F. Harris, 1897): synonym of † Veruturris subconcavus (G. F. Harris, 1897)
- † Xenuroturris tomopleuroides Powell, 1944: synonym of † Veruturris tomopleuroides (Powell, 1944)

== Sources ==
- Abdelkrim, J.; Aznar-Cormano, L.; Buge, B.; Fedosov, A.; Kantor, Y.; Zaharias, P.; Puillandre, N. (2018). Delimiting species of marine gastropods (Turridae, Conoidea) using RAD sequencing in an integrative taxonomy framework. Molecular Ecology. 27(22): 4591-4611
- Kantor, Y.I., Puillandre, N., Olivera, B.M. & Bouchet, P. 2008. Morphological Proxies for Taxonomic Decision in Turrids (Mollusca, Neogastropoda): a Test of the Value of Shell and Radula Characters using Molecular Data. Zoological Science (Tokyo) 25: 1156-1170
- Kantor, Yuri; Bouchet, Philippe; Fedosov, Alexander; Puillandre, Nicolas; Zaharias, Paul (2024). "Generic revision of the Recent Turridae (Neogastropoda: Conoidea)" (PDF). Journal of Molluscan Studies. 90 (5) eyae032. doi:10.1093/mollus/eyae032.
- Medinskaya, A.A., & Sysoev, A.V. 2001. The foregut anatomy of the genus Xenuroturris (Gastropoda, Conoidea, Turridae), with a description of a new genus. Ruthenica 11: 7–14.
- Olivera, B.M. 2002. The gastropod genus Xenuroturris (Iredale, 1929) evaluated and a new turrid Lophiotoma olangoensis described from the Central Philippines. Science Diliman 14(2): 39-49
