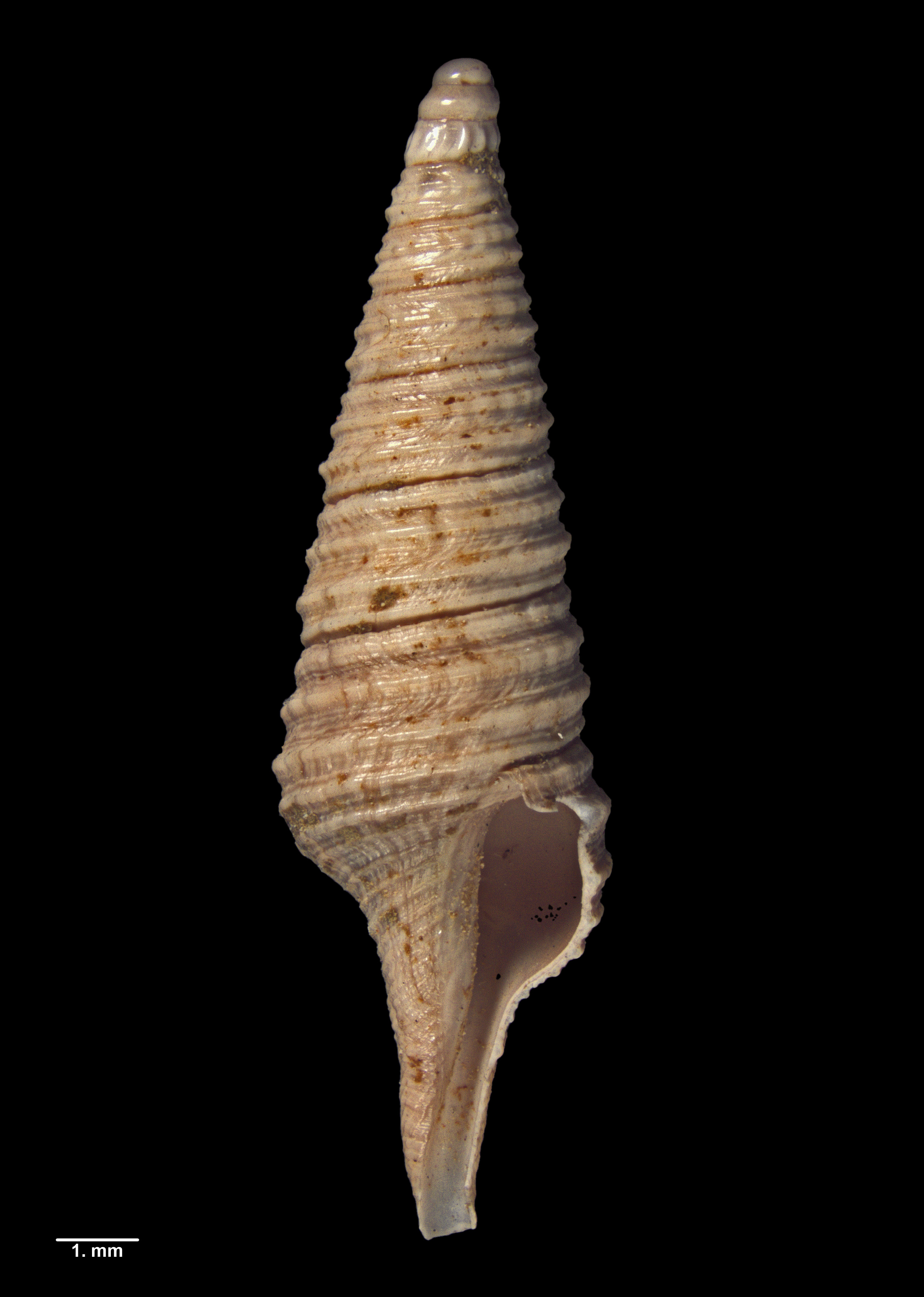
- Holotype of Veruturris quadricarinata

Scientific classification
- Kingdom: Animalia
- Phylum: Mollusca
- Class: Gastropoda
- Subclass: Caenogastropoda
- Order: Neogastropoda
- Family: incertae sedis
- Genus: †Veruturris; Powell, 1944

Type species
- † Veruturris quadricarinatus Powell, 1944

Synonyms
- Xenuroturris (Veruturris) Powell, 1944

= Veruturris =

Veruturris Temporal range: Late Eocene–Middle Miocene

Genus of gastropods

Veruturris is an extinct genus of sea snails, marine gastropod mollusks in the superfamily Conoidea, currently unassigned to a family. Fossils of the genus date to between the Late Eocene and middle Miocene, and have been found in strata in South Australia and Victoria.

== Description ==
In the original description, Powell described the genus as below:

A compact group of Australian Tertiary turrids, close to Xenuroturris, Same style of paucispiral protoconch with brephic axials, sinus "V"-shaped at about two-thirds whorl height and subangulate base, but discordant in having a moderately long anterior canal. The canal is shorter than in Turris and Lophiotoma, but very different from the truncated canal of true Xenuroturris.

Members of the genus have a height of between 14–50 mm (0.55–1.97 in), a tall spire, but only a moderately long canal. This relatively short canal, which is not as truncated as Xenuroturris, is an identifying feature of the genus.

== Taxonomy ==
Veruturris was first described by Baden Powell in 1944 as a subgenus of Xenuroturris. Powell named Veruturris quadricarinatus as the type species of Veruturris. It was raised to genus level by Powell in 1964.

== Distribution ==
The earliest known fossils species in the genus date to the Late Eocene, and the majority of known species date to the middle Miocene. Fossils in the genus have been found in South Australia and Victoria, including the Browns Creek Formation and Muddy Creek Formation of the Otway Basin, the Gellibrand Formation of the Port Phillip Basin, and the Dry Creek Sands of the St Vincent Basin.

== Species ==
Species within the genus Veruturris include:

- † Veruturris bisculpta (Powell, 1944)
- † Veruturris quadricarinata (Powell, 1944)
- † Veruturris subconcava (G. F. Harris, 1897)
- † Veruturris tomopleuroides (Powell, 1944)

== Gallery ==
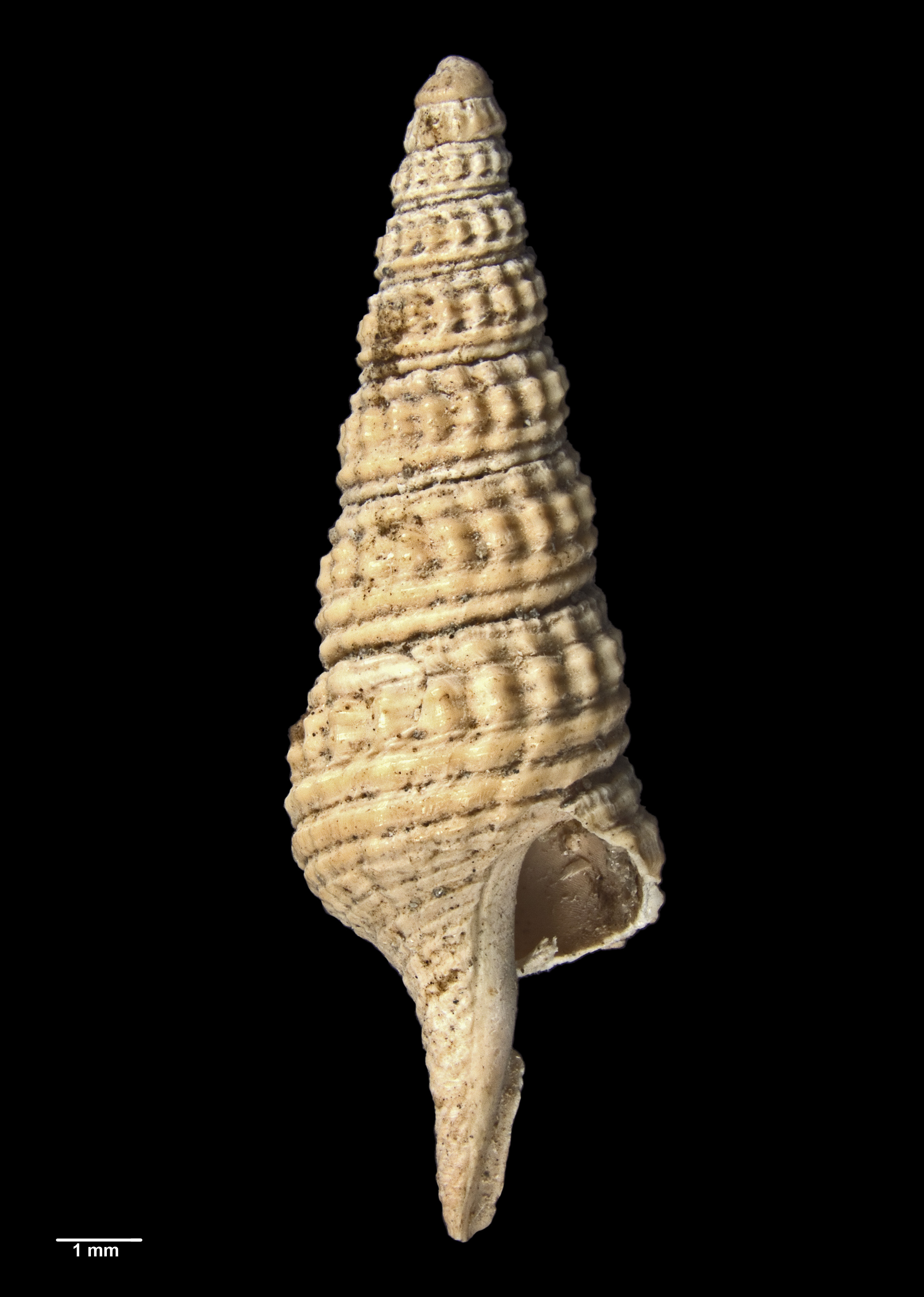
Veruturris bisculpta

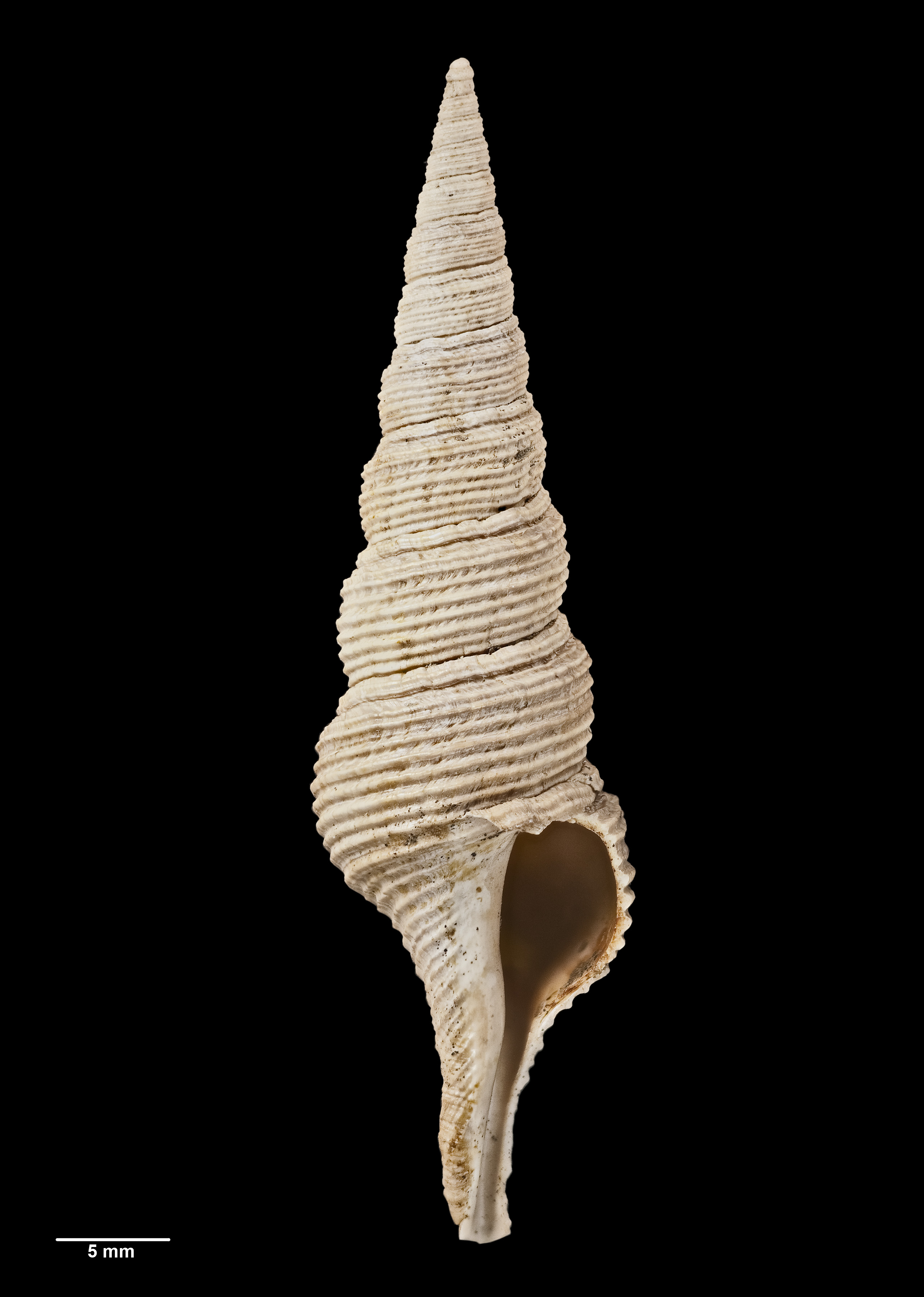
Veruturris subconcava

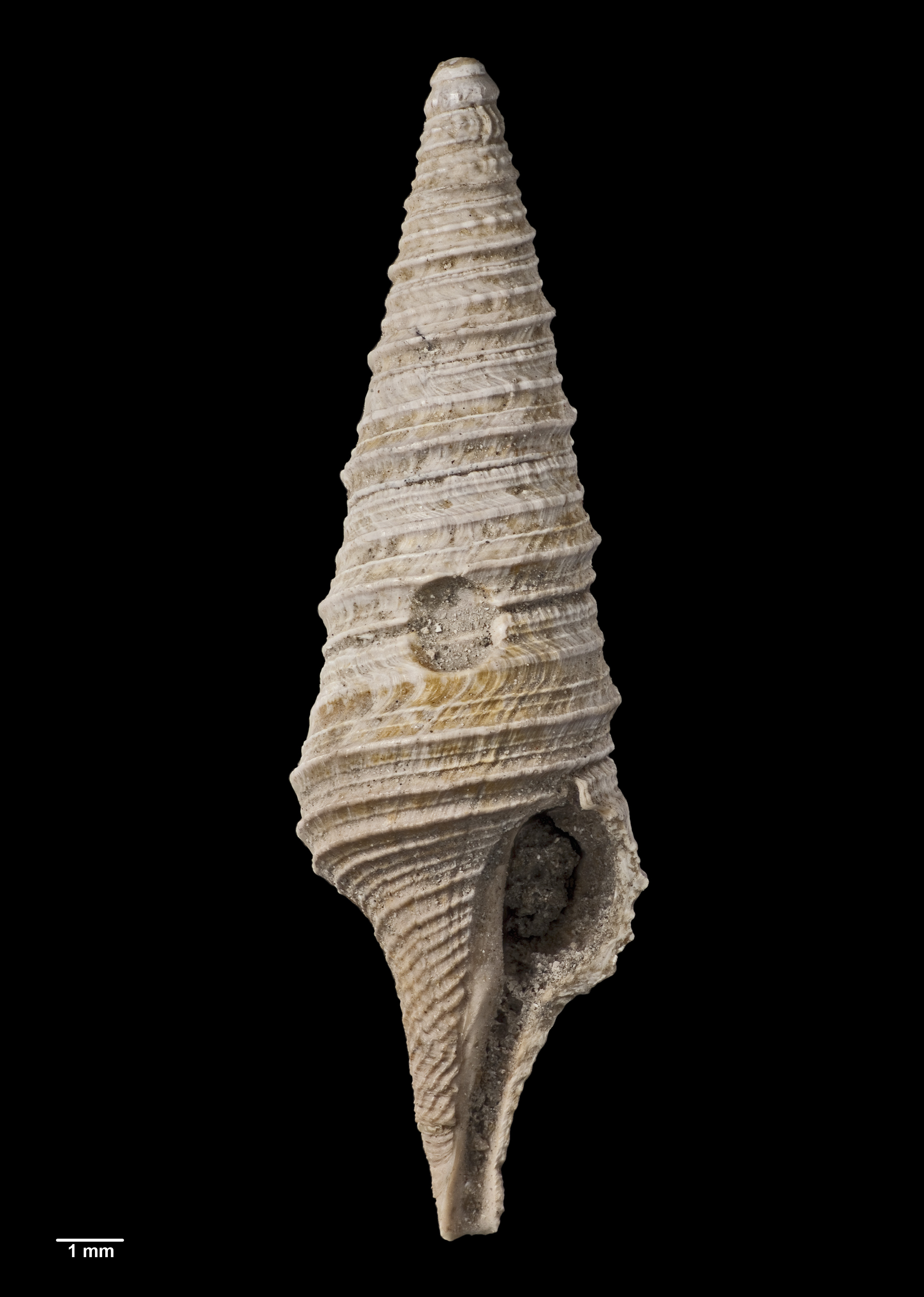
Veruturris tomopleuroides
