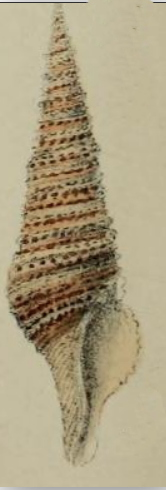
- Original image of a shell of Iotyrris notata

Scientific classification
- Kingdom: Animalia
- Phylum: Mollusca
- Class: Gastropoda
- Subclass: Caenogastropoda
- Order: Neogastropoda
- Superfamily: Conoidea
- Family: Turridae
- Genus: Iotyrris
- Species: I. notata

Binomial name
- Iotyrris notata (G. B. Sowerby III, 1889)

Synonyms
- Lophiotoma notata (G. B. Sowerby III, 1889); Pleurotoma notata G. B. Sowerby III, 1889 (original combination)

= Iotyrris notata =

Species of gastropod

Iotyrris notata is a species of sea snail, a marine gastropod mollusk in the family Turridae, the turrids.

== Description ==
The length of the shell varies between 45 mm and 60 mm.

The white, elongate, fusiform shell is transversely finely ridged throughout, the numerous ridges being articulated with minute brown dots. The spire is acuminate. The shell contains fourteen, flattish whorls. These are on top angulate and excavated below the suture. The body whorl is somewhat rounded, contracted at its base and somewhat produced. The ovate aperture is dirty white. The columella is straight and smooth. The outer lip is arcuate. The sinus is rather deeply emarginate. The siphonal canal is short.

== Distribution ==
This marine species occurs off Hong Kong, Vietnam and Japan.
