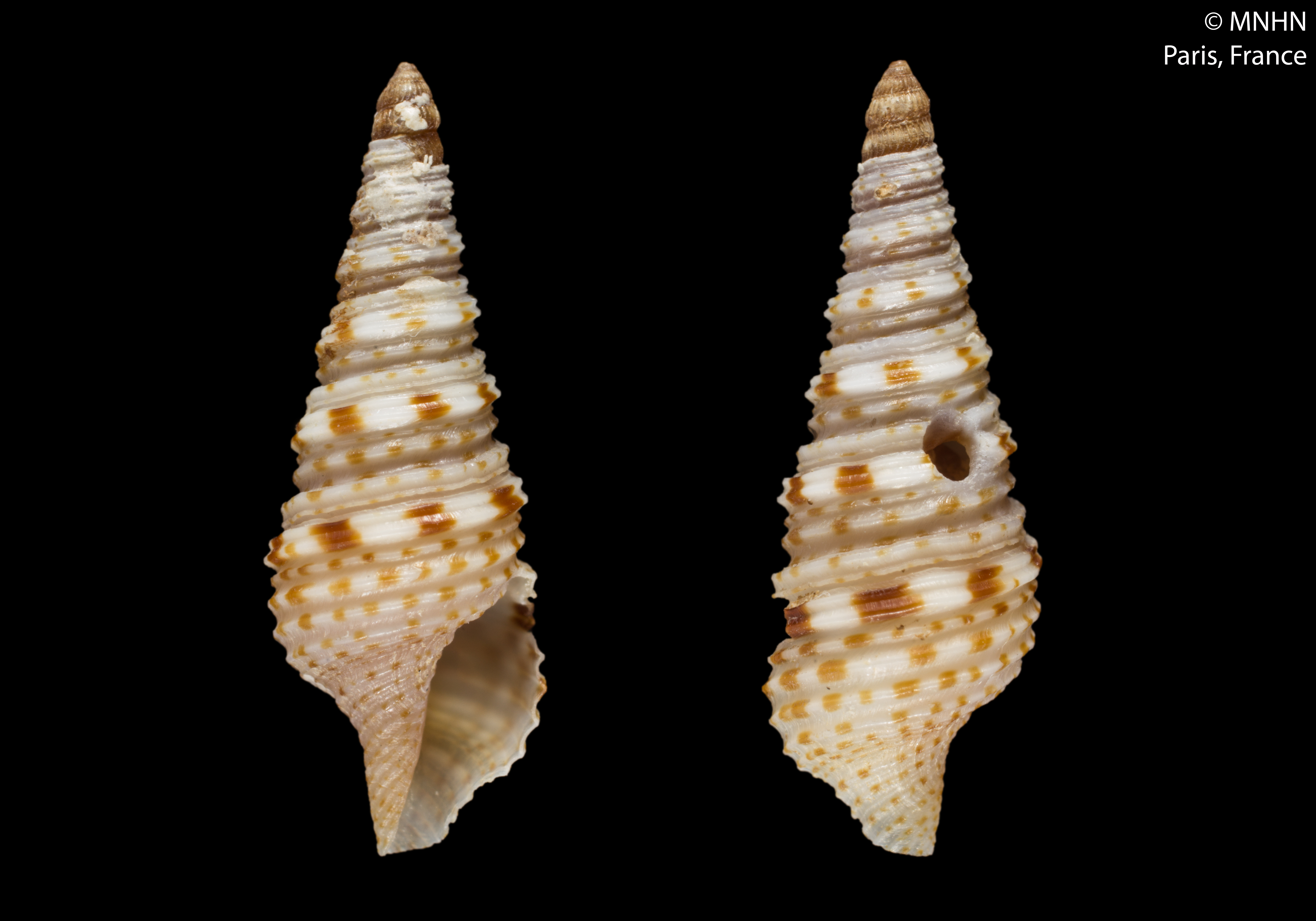
- Shell of Iotyrris musivum (holotype at MNHN, Paris)

Scientific classification
- Kingdom: Animalia
- Phylum: Mollusca
- Class: Gastropoda
- Subclass: Caenogastropoda
- Order: Neogastropoda
- Superfamily: Conoidea
- Family: Turridae
- Genus: Iotyrris
- Species: I. musivum

Binomial name
- Iotyrris musivum Kantor et al., 2008

= Iotyrris musivum =

Species of gastropod

Iotyrris musivum is a species of sea snail, a marine gastropod mollusk in the family Turridae, the turrids.

== Description ==
The length of the shell attains 12.6 mm.

== Distribution ==
This marine species occurs off Vanuatu and New Ireland in the Bismarck Archipelago.
