= Pseudogemmula =

Scientific classification
- Kingdom: Animalia
- Phylum: Mollusca
- Class: Gastropoda
- Subclass: Caenogastropoda
- Order: Neogastropoda
- Superfamily: Conoidea
- Family: Turridae
- Genus: Pseudogemmula; Kantor, Bouchet, Fedosov, Puillandre & Zaharias, 2024

Type species
- Xenuroturris gemmuloides A. W. B. Powell, 1967

Genus of gastropods

Pseudogemmula is a genus of sea snails, marine gastropod mollusks in the family Turridae, the turrids.

== Species ==
- Pseudogemmula gemmuloides (A. W. B. Powell, 1967)
- Pseudogemmula pseudogranosa (Nomura, 1940)
