= Pseudogemmula pseudogranosa =

Scientific classification
- Kingdom: Animalia
- Phylum: Mollusca
- Class: Gastropoda
- Subclass: Caenogastropoda
- Order: Neogastropoda
- Superfamily: Conoidea
- Family: Turridae
- Genus: Pseudogemmula
- Species: P. pseudogranosa

Binomial name
- Pseudogemmula pseudogranosa (Nomura, 1940)

Synonyms
- Gemmula pseudogranosa (Nomura, 1940) superseded combination; Turris (Gemmula) pseudogranosa Nomura, 1940

Species of gastropod

Pseudogemmula pseudogranosa is a species of sea snail, a marine gastropod mollusk in the family Turridae, the turrids.

== Description ==
The length of the shell attains 20.9 mm.

== Distribution ==
This marine species occurs off Japan, Taiwan and in the East China Sea.
