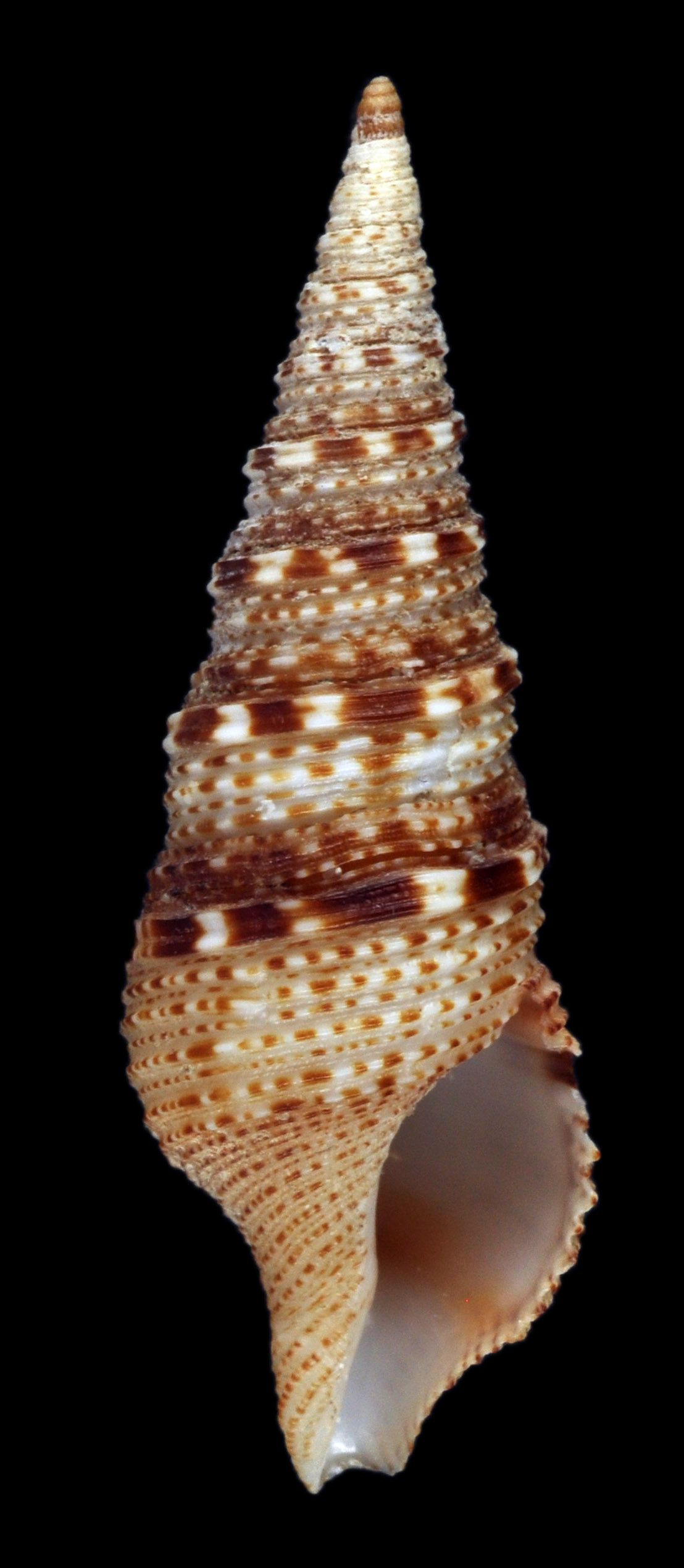

Scientific classification
- Kingdom: Animalia
- Phylum: Mollusca
- Class: Gastropoda
- Subclass: Caenogastropoda
- Order: Neogastropoda
- Superfamily: Conoidea
- Family: Turridae
- Genus: Iotyrris
- Species: I. conotaxis

Binomial name
- Iotyrris conotaxis Abdelkrim, Aznar-Cormano, Buge, Fedosov, Kantor, Zaharias & Puillandre, 2018

= Iotyrris conotaxis =

Species of gastropod

Iotyrris conotaxis is a species of sea snail, a marine gastropod mollusk in the family Turridae, the turrids.

== Distribution ==
This marine species occurs off Cebu, the Philippines at depths between 15 mm and 20 m.
