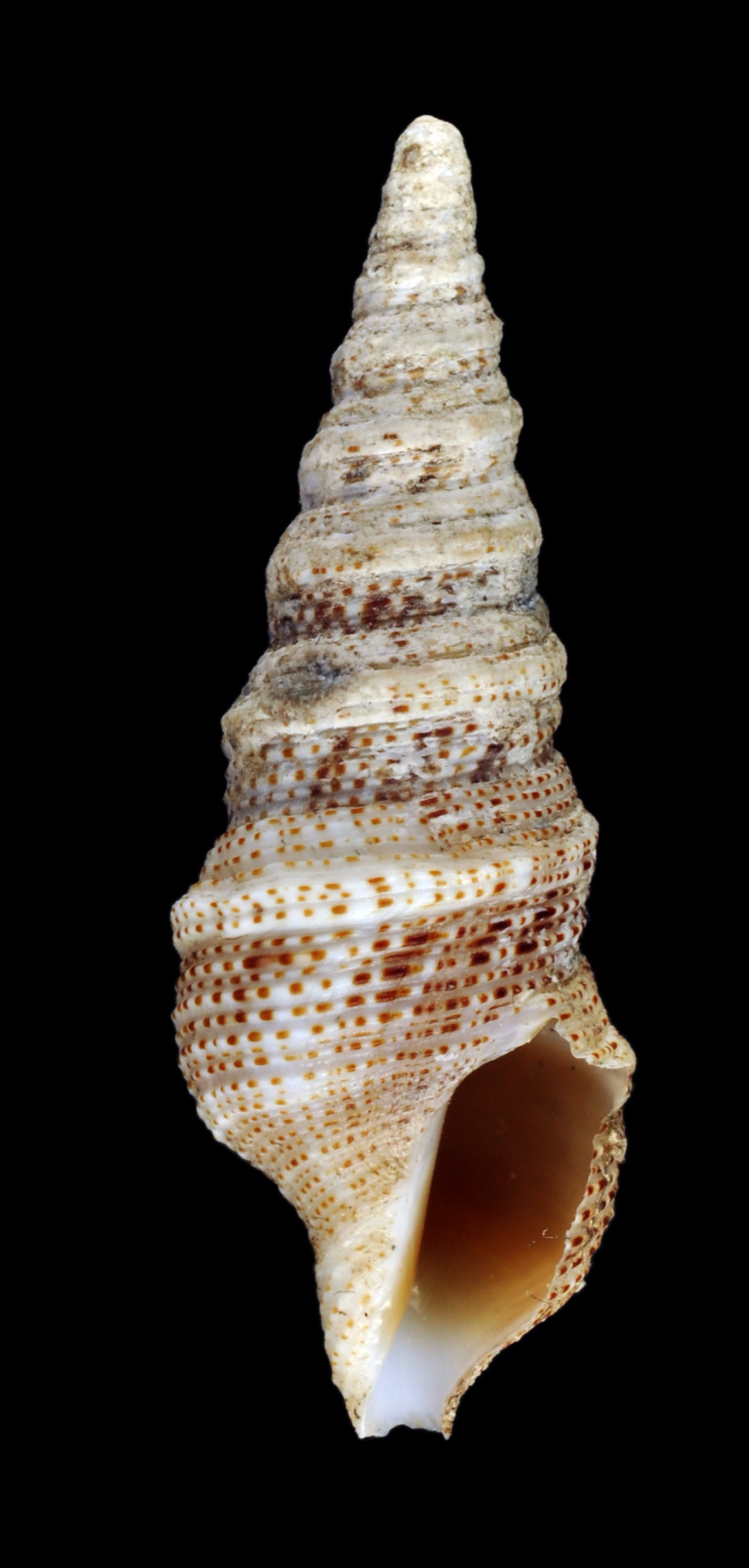
- Shell of Xenuroturris millepunctata

Scientific classification
- Kingdom: Animalia
- Phylum: Mollusca
- Class: Gastropoda
- Subclass: Caenogastropoda
- Order: Neogastropoda
- Family: Turridae
- Genus: Xenuroturris
- Species: X. millepunctata

Binomial name
- Xenuroturris millepunctata (Sowerby III, 1908)

Synonyms
- Lophiotoma (Xenuroturris) millepunctata (G. B. Sowerby III, 1909); Lophiotoma millepunctata (G. B. Sowerby III, 1908); Pleurotoma cingulifera var. zonifera Bouge & Dautzenberg, 1914; Pleurotoma millepunctata G.B. Sowerby III, 1908

= Xenuroturris millepunctata =

Species of gastropod

Xenuroturris millepunctata is a species of sea snail, a marine gastropod mollusk in the family Turridae, the turrids.

== Description ==
The length of the shell attains 38 mm, its diameter 13 mm.

(Original description in Latin) The elongate-turreted shell is yellowish-white and brown at the apex. It shows very small brown dots marked on every side and is sometimes decorated with flames in a few dark patches. The spire is elongated, sharp and graduated. It contains 10 whorls. The apex is smooth, then the shell is angularly carinated and shows spiral lirae. The shoulders are slightly concave. The suture has a very narrow channel. The body whorl is shorter, convex, angled below, concave and-constricted, with a very short rostrum. The aperture is ovate. The siphonal canal is short. The outer lip is sharp and serrated. The columella is smooth.

== Distribution ==
This marine species occurs in the Indo-West Pacific; also off the Philippines, Japan and Australia (Queensland)
