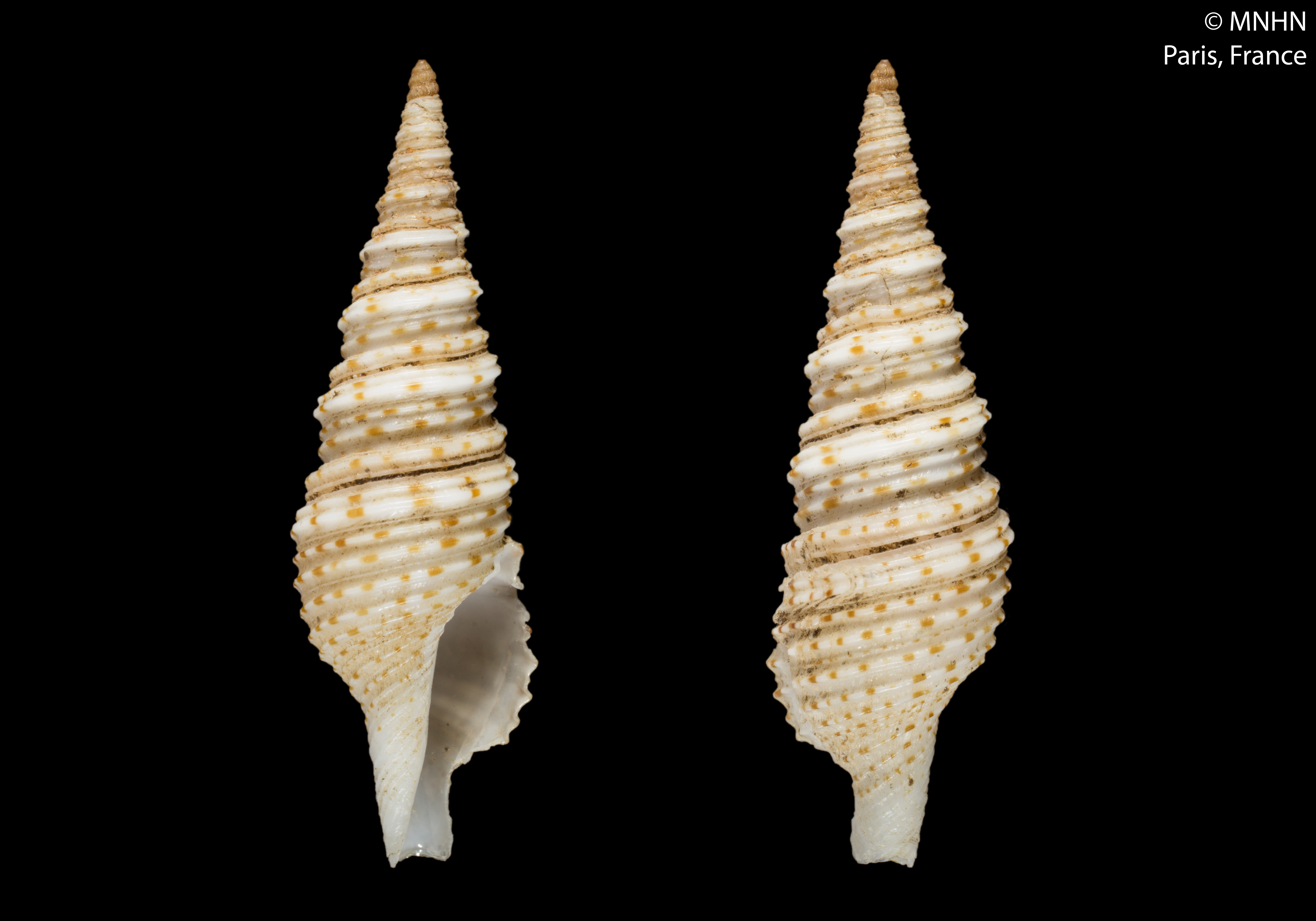

Scientific classification
- Kingdom: Animalia
- Phylum: Mollusca
- Class: Gastropoda
- Subclass: Caenogastropoda
- Order: Neogastropoda
- Superfamily: Conoidea
- Family: Turridae
- Genus: Iotyrris
- Species: I. marquesensis

Binomial name
- Iotyrris marquesensis Sysoev, 2002

Synonyms
- Lophiotoma kingae (Powell, 1964); Xenuroturris kingae Powell, 1964 (original combination)

= Iotyrris marquesensis =

Species of gastropod

Iotyrris marquesensis is a species of sea snail, a marine gastropod mollusk in the family Turridae, the turrids.

== Description ==
The length of the shell attains 29 mm.

This species is a non-broadcast spawner. Life cycle does not include trochophore stage.

== Distribution ==
This marine species occurs off Hiva Oa Island, Marquesas Islands.
