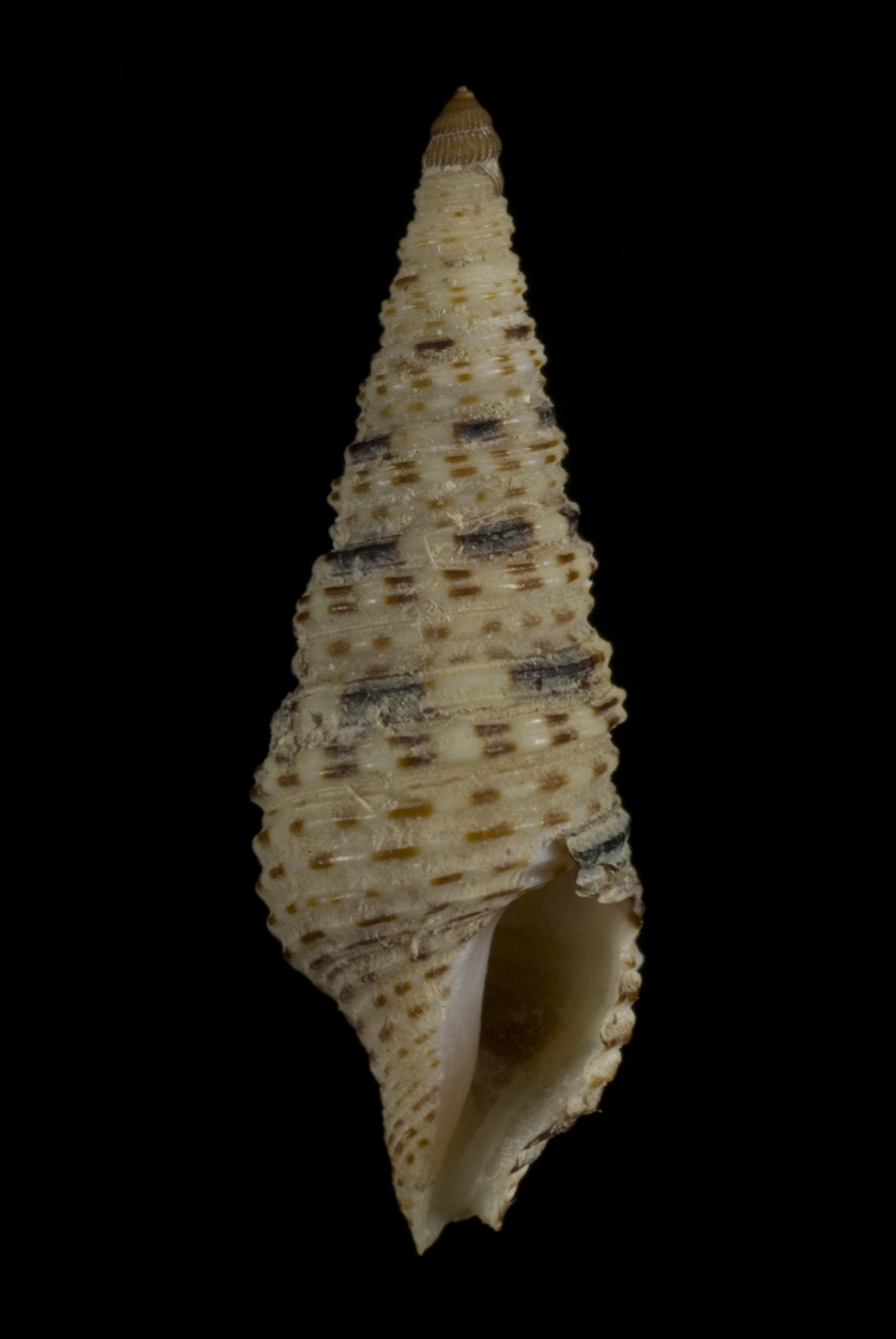
- Shell of Iotyrris devoizei (specimen at MNHN, Paris)

Scientific classification
- Kingdom: Animalia
- Phylum: Mollusca
- Class: Gastropoda
- Subclass: Caenogastropoda
- Order: Neogastropoda
- Superfamily: Conoidea
- Family: Turridae
- Genus: Iotyrris
- Species: I. devoizei

Binomial name
- Iotyrris devoizei Kantor et al., 2008

= Iotyrris devoizei =

Species of gastropod

Iotyrris devoizei is a species of sea snail, a marine gastropod mollusk in the family Turridae, the turrids.

== Distribution ==
I. devoizei has been found in Vanuatu and Mozambique.
