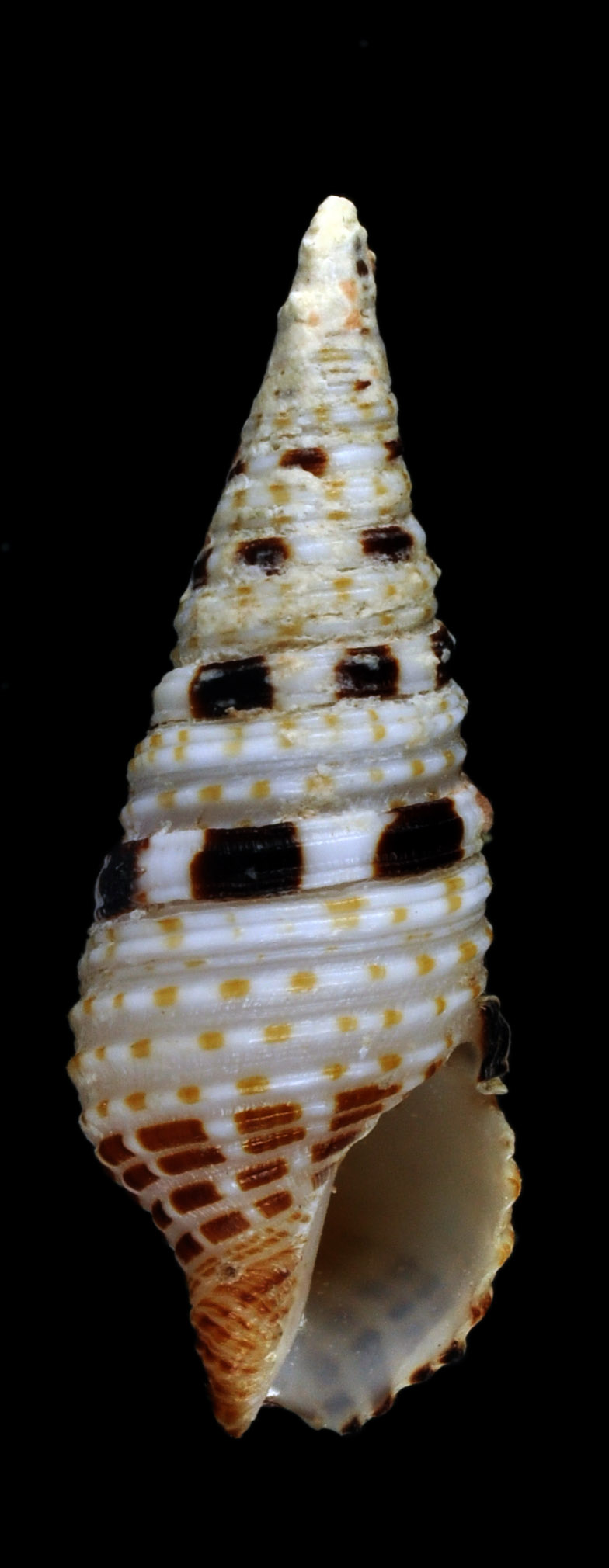
- Shell of Xenuroturris kingae (specimen at MNHN, Paris)

Scientific classification
- Kingdom: Animalia
- Phylum: Mollusca
- Class: Gastropoda
- Subclass: Caenogastropoda
- Order: Neogastropoda
- Superfamily: Conoidea
- Family: Turridae
- Genus: Xenuroturris
- Species: X. kingae

Binomial name
- Xenuroturris kingae A.W.B. Powell, 1964

Synonyms
- Iotyrris kingae (A. W. B. Powell, 1964) superseded combination; Lophiotoma kingae (Powell, 1964)

= Xenuroturris kingae =

Species of gastropod

Xenuroturris kingae is a species of sea snail, a marine gastropod mollusk in the family Turridae, the turrids.

== Taxonomy ==
The species was known also as Iotyrris kingae. The genus Iotyrris was synonymized with Xenuroturris in 2024 following a comprehensive phylogenetic revision of the family Turridae. Iotyrris had originally been distinguished from Xenuroturris based on radular morphology; while species of Xenuroturris were characterized by "duplex" marginal radular teeth, those assigned to Iotyrris possessed "semi-enrolled" marginal teeth.

However, molecular analyses utilizing exon-capture data demonstrated that these radular traits were homoplastic and not consistent with the phylogeny. The study found that species possessing duplex teeth (such as X. olangoensis, X. kingae, and X. notata) fell into the same well-supported clade as species with semi-enrolled teeth. Because the radular morphology was found to lack diagnostic value at the generic level, Iotyrris was reduced to a synonym of Xenuroturris.

== Description ==
The length of the shell varies between 20 mm and 35 mm.

== Distribution ==
X. kingae has been found off the Hawaiian Islands, Christmas Island and the Philippines.

== Sources ==
- Kantor, Yuri; Bouchet, Philippe; Fedosov, Alexander; Puillandre, Nicolas; Zaharias, Paul (2024). "Generic revision of the Recent Turridae (Neogastropoda: Conoidea)" (PDF). Journal of Molluscan Studies. 90 (5) eyae032. doi:10.1093/mollus/eyae032.
- Medinskaya, A.A., & Sysoev, A.V. 2001. The foregut anatomy of the genus Xenuroturris (Gastropoda, Conoidea, Turridae), with a description of a new genus. Ruthenica 11: 7-14.
- Powell, A. W. B. 1964. The family Turridae in the Indo-Pacific. Indo-Pacific Mollusca 1. (5): 227–346; 1 (7): 409–454.
