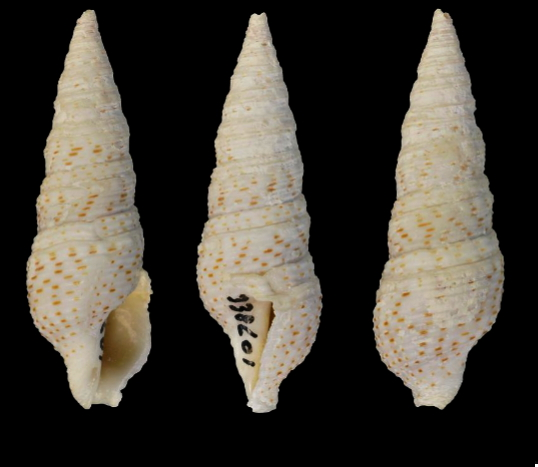
- Shell of Iotyrris cerithiformis (holotype at the Smithsonian Institution)

Scientific classification
- Kingdom: Animalia
- Phylum: Mollusca
- Class: Gastropoda
- Subclass: Caenogastropoda
- Order: Neogastropoda
- Superfamily: Conoidea
- Family: Turridae
- Genus: Iotyrris
- Species: I. cerithiformis

Binomial name
- Iotyrris cerithiformis (Powell, 1964)

Synonyms
- Lophiotoma cerithiformis (Powell, 1964); Pleurotoma lirata Pease, 1869; Turris cerithiformis (Dall, ms.) (Tinker, 1952); Turris lirata (W.H. Pease, 1869): Xenuroturris cerithiformis Powell, 1964

= Iotyrris cerithiformis =

Species of gastropod

Iotyrris cerithiformis is a species of sea snail, a marine gastropod mollusk in the family Turridae, the turrids.

== Description ==
The length of the shell attains 35 mm, its diameter 12 mm.

(Original description by Pease) The fusiform, turreted shell is keeled all over. The keels are nearly of the same size, and almost equidistant. The keel on the middle of the whorls is slightly the largest. The intermediate superfices are concave. The interstices between the keels are finely striate longitudinally. The sinus is deep. The siphonal canal is short. The color of the shell is white, the keels are spotted with reddish brown.

The above species may be distinguished by the regularity of its keels. The spots are small, oblong, and confined to the edge of the keels.

== Distribution ==
This marine species occurs off the Hawaii Islands at a depth of 11 m to 15 m.
