= Xenuroturris castanellus =

Scientific classification
- Kingdom: Animalia
- Phylum: Mollusca
- Class: Gastropoda
- Subclass: Caenogastropoda
- Order: Neogastropoda
- Family: Turridae
- Genus: Xenuroturris
- Species: X. castanellus

Binomial name
- Xenuroturris castanellus Powell, 1964

Species of gastropod

Xenuroturris castanellus is a species of sea snail, a marine gastropod mollusk in the family Turridae, the turrids.

== Description ==
The length of the shell attains 26.4 mm.

== Distribution ==
This marine species occurs off Hawaii.
