= Xenuroturris emmae =

Scientific classification
- Kingdom: Animalia
- Phylum: Mollusca
- Class: Gastropoda
- Subclass: Caenogastropoda
- Order: Neogastropoda
- Family: Turridae
- Genus: Xenuroturris
- Species: X. emmae

Binomial name
- Xenuroturris emmae Bozzetti, 1993

Species of gastropod

Xenuroturris emmae is a species of sea snail, a marine gastropod mollusk in the family Turridae, the turrids.

== Taxonomy ==
Due to a very different appearance from other members of the Xenuroturris (orange-brown-cultured shell with irregular positions of lighter spots), Kantor et al. 2024 state that attribution of the species to Xenuroturris is "only conditional[...]" until more data is acquired.

== Distribution ==
This marine species occurs off Somalia.

== Sources ==
- Bozzetti, L. (1994). Description of two new species of the genera Xenuroturris Iredale and Inquisitor from north-western Indian Ocean (Gastropoda Turridae). Bulletin of the Institute of Malacology, Tokyo. 3(2): 24-27.
- Kantor, Yuri; Bouchet, Philippe; Fedosov, Alexander; Puillandre, Nicolas; Zaharias, Paul (2024). "Generic revision of the Recent Turridae (Neogastropoda: Conoidea)" (PDF). Journal of Molluscan Studies. 90 (5) eyae032. doi:10.1093/mollus/eyae032.
