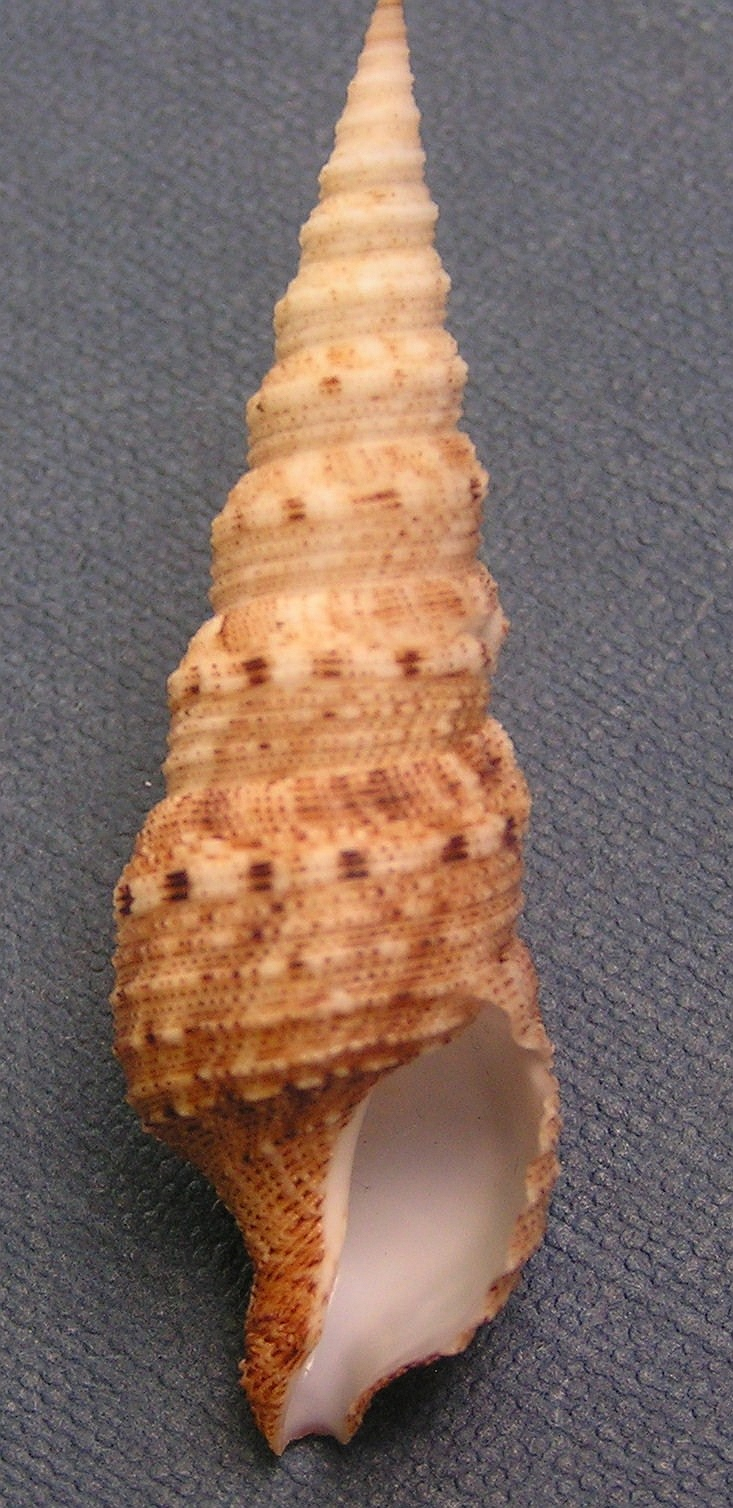
- Apertural view of Iotyrris cingulifera

Scientific classification
- Kingdom: Animalia
- Phylum: Mollusca
- Class: Gastropoda
- Subclass: Caenogastropoda
- Order: Neogastropoda
- Superfamily: Conoidea
- Family: Turridae
- Genus: Iotyrris
- Species: I. cingulifera

Binomial name
- Iotyrris cingulifera (Lamarck, 1822)

Synonyms
- Clamturris incredula Iredale, 1931; Lophiotoma cingulifera (Lamarck, 1822); Lophiotoma (Xenuroturris) incredula Iredale, T., 1931; Pleurotoma cingulifera Lamarck, 1822 (basionym); Turris cingulifera; Xenuroturris cingulifera (Lamarck, 1822)

= Iotyrris cingulifera =

Species of gastropod

Iotyrris cingulifera is a species of sea snail, a marine gastropod mollusk in the family Turridae, the turrids.

== Description ==
The length of the fusiform shell is 53 mm and its diameter 16 mm. The shell is rather narrow with a very long spire and short siphonal canal. It is corded with larger and smaller riblets and raised lines. The shell is very slightly angulated on each whorl by a somewhat larger rib, which is occasionally bipartite. The growth striae are sharp, sometimes decussating the smaller spiral lines. The color of the shell is whitish, very closely and finely peppered with chestnut and with chestnut spots on the shoulder rib.

== Distribution ==
This marine species occurs in the Aldabra, Madagascar, Mozambique, Mascarene Basin, Mauritius, the Red Sea and Tanzania
