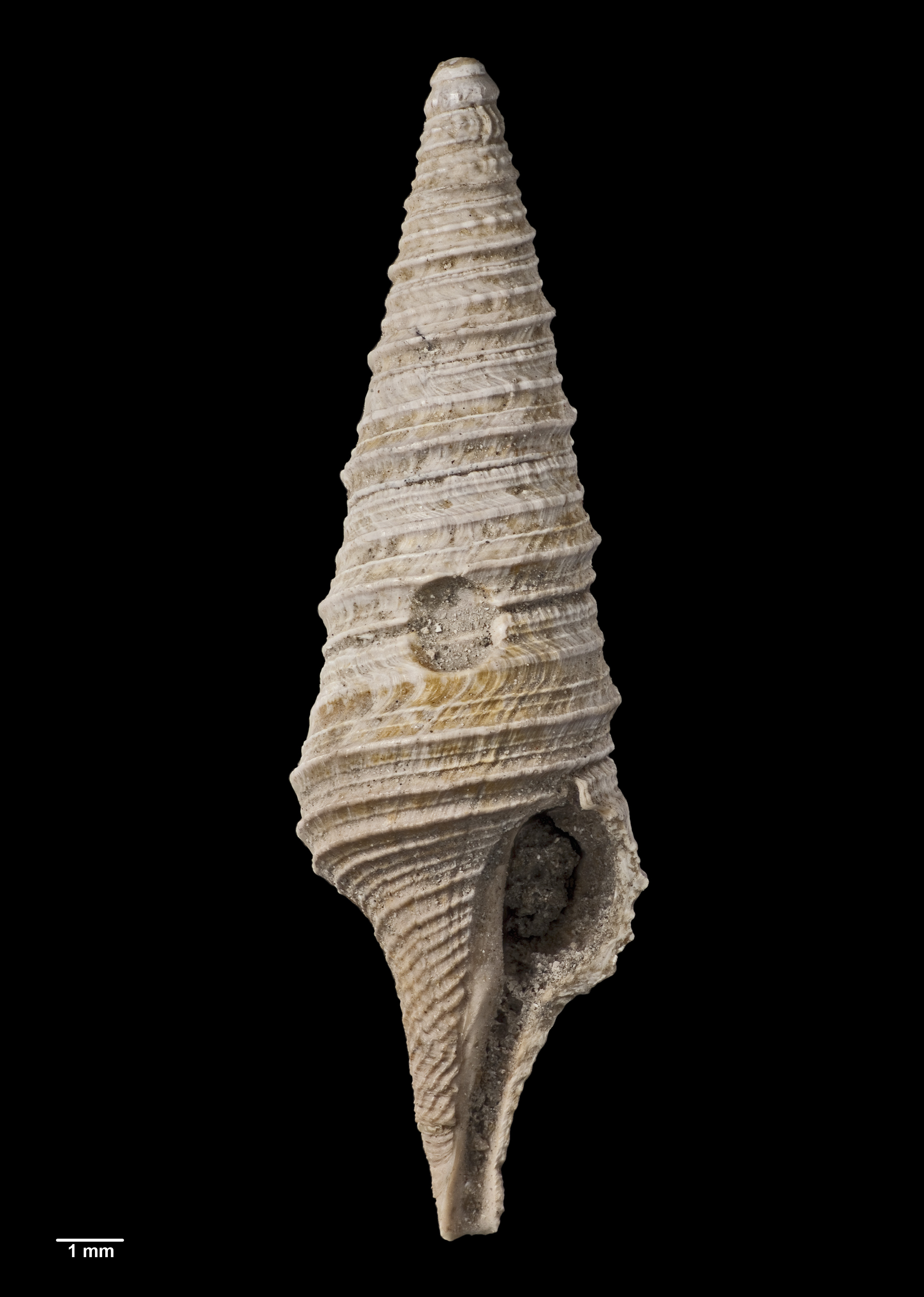
- Holotype of Veruturris tomopleuroides from Auckland War Memorial Museum

Scientific classification
- Kingdom: Animalia
- Phylum: Mollusca
- Class: Gastropoda
- Subclass: Caenogastropoda
- Order: Neogastropoda
- Family: incertae sedis
- Genus: †Veruturris
- Species: †V. tomopleuroides

Binomial name
- †Veruturris tomopleuroides (Powell, 1944)

Synonyms
- † Xenuroturris (Veruturris) tomopleuroides Powell, 1944; † Xenuroturris tomopleuroides Powell, 1944

= Veruturris tomopleuroides =

Extinct species of gastropod

Veruturris tomopleuroides is an extinct species of marine gastropod mollusc in the superfamily Conoidea, currently unassigned to a family. Fossils of the species date to the middle Miocene, and are found in the St Vincent Basin of South Australia.

== Description ==
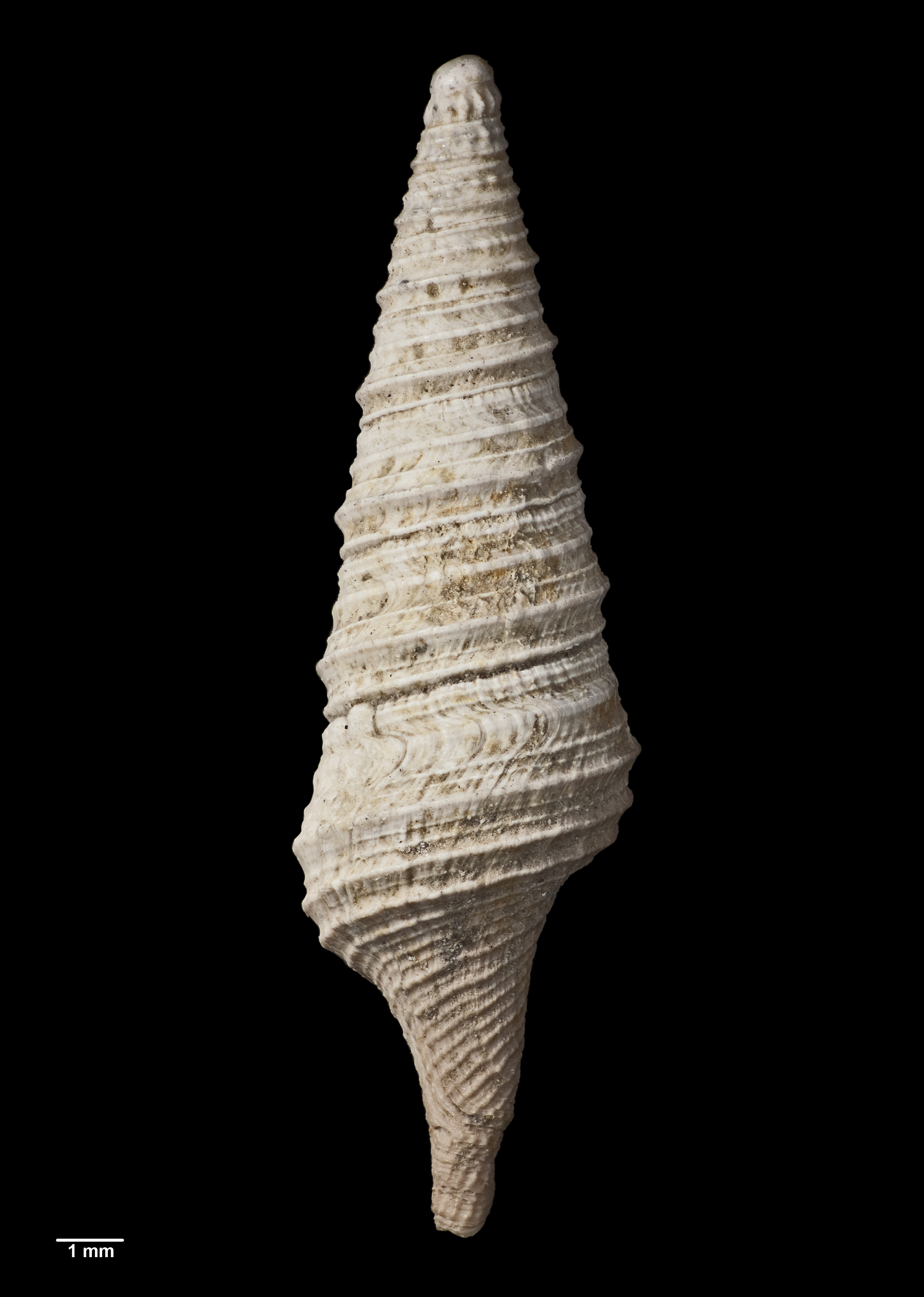
View of reverse side of holotype

In the original description, Powell described the species' as follows:

Shell small, with a prominent peripheral carina at one fourth whorl height, which gives the species a deceptive resemblance to Tomopleura. Protoconch broadly rounded, smooth, of 2 whorls, followed by three-fourths of a whorl of brephic axials. Spire-whorls with two spiral threads submargining upper suture, a moderately strong cord at three-fourths whorl height, and the peripheral carina, followed by a third strong spiral at the lower suture. A fourth strong spiral cord emerges from just beneath the top of the aperture. Below this there are about 18 much weaker cords on the base and anterior end. There are occasional interstitial threads on the spire whorls. Sinus broadly "V"-shaped, with its apex on the uppermost of the strong cords. There are weak gemmules on the sinus carina over the early whorls. Aperture and canal as in quadricarinatus.

The holotype of the species measures 17.5 mm (0.69 in) in height and 5.5 mm (0.22 in) in diameter.

== Taxonomy ==
The species was first described by A.W.B. Powell in 1944 under the name Xenuroturris (Veruturris) tomopleuroides. When Veruturris was raised to genus level by Powell in 1964, the species began being referred to by its currently accepted name, Veruturris tomopleuroides. The holotype was collected by Walter Howchin and J. C. Verco in 1919 from the Metropolitan Abattoirs Bore in Adelaide, Australia, and is held by the Auckland War Memorial Museum.

== Distribution ==
This extinct marine species occurs in middle Miocene (Bairnsdalian) strata of the St Vincent Basin, Adelaide, South Australia, including the lower Dry Creek Sands at a depth of between 122–152 m (400–499 ft).
