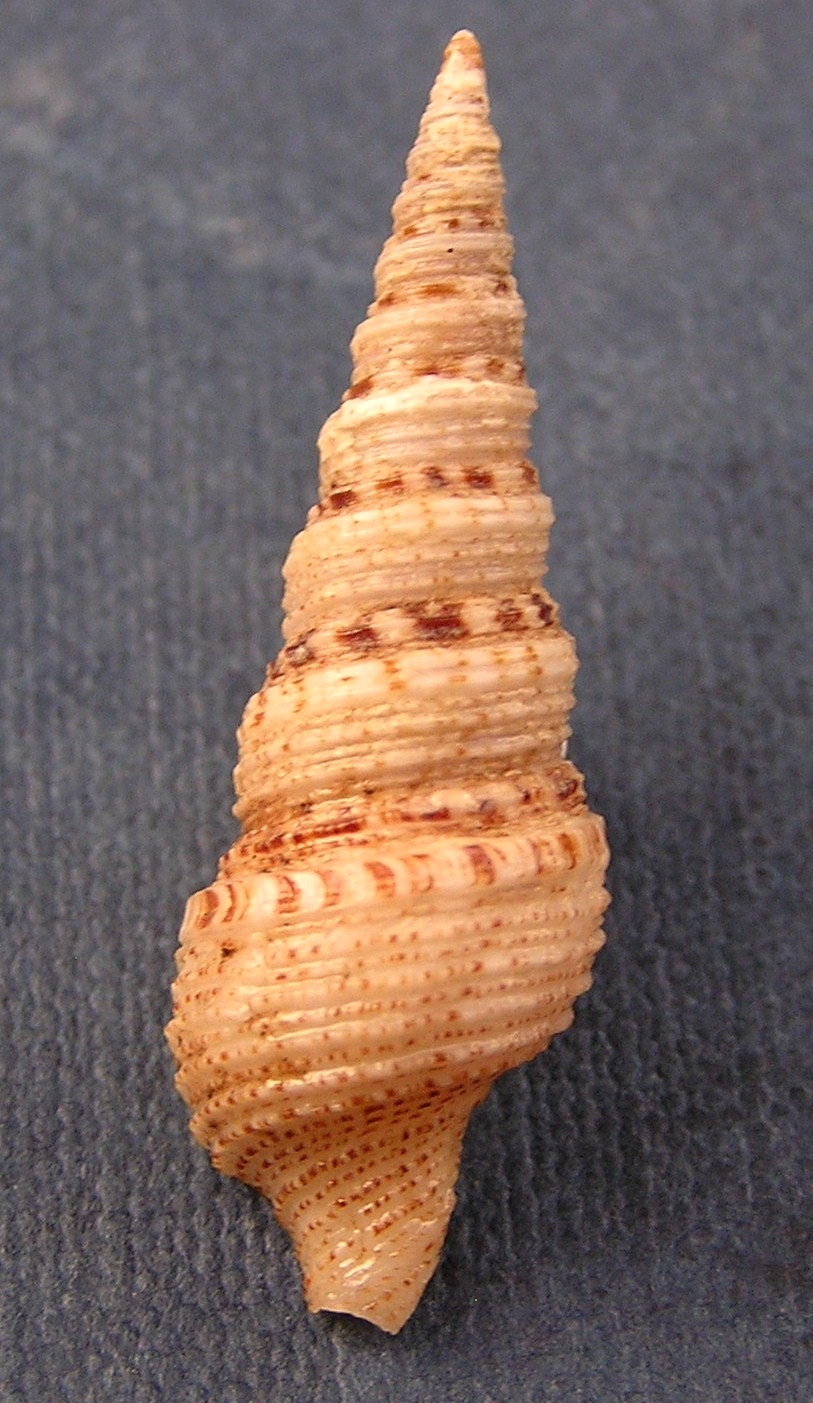
- Shell of Iotyrris olangoensis

Scientific classification
- Kingdom: Animalia
- Phylum: Mollusca
- Class: Gastropoda
- Subclass: Caenogastropoda
- Order: Neogastropoda
- Superfamily: Conoidea
- Family: Turridae
- Genus: Iotyrris
- Species: I. olangoensis

Binomial name
- Iotyrris olangoensis (Olivera, 2002)

Synonyms
- Xenuroturris olangoensis (Olivera, 2002) (currently accepted combination); Lophiotoma olangoensis Olivera, 2002 (original combination); Lophiotoma (Xenuroturris) olangoensis Olivera, 2002

= Iotyrris olangoensis =

Species of gastropod

Iotyrris olangoensis is a species of sea snail, a marine gastropod mollusk in the family Turridae, the turrids. It was first described in 2002 by B. M. Olivera as Lophiotoma olangoensis, from the central Philippines. Following the 2024 generic revision of the family Turridae, the currently accepted combination is Xenuroturris olangoensis, with Iotyrris olangoensis treated as a synonym.

== Taxonomy ==
The species was described as Lophiotoma olangoensis by B. M. Olivera in 2002, in a paper evaluating the genus Xenuroturris that was published in Science Diliman. The specific epithet olangoensis refers to Olango Island, off Cebu City in the central Philippines, the type locality of the species.

The species was later transferred to the genus Iotyrris as Iotyrris olangoensis. Iotyrris had originally been distinguished from Xenuroturris by radular morphology: the marginal teeth of the radula of Xenuroturris species were characterized as "duplex", while those of Iotyrris were "semi-enrolled". However, in their 2024 generic revision of the Recent Turridae, based on an exon-capture phylogeny, Kantor et al. found these radular characters to be homoplastic and not diagnostic at genus level, and consequently synonymized Iotyrris with Xenuroturris; the species is now placed as Xenuroturris olangoensis. In an earlier integrative-taxonomy study using RAD sequencing, I. olangoensis was recovered within the Xenuroturris/Iotyrris complex — a group of venomous Indo-Pacific turrids — and confirmed to possess duplex marginal radular teeth; several members of the complex occur sympatrically in the Philippines.

== Description ==
The length of the shell varies between 30 mm and 45 mm. A paratype in the collection of the Bailey-Matthews National Shell Museum (BMSM 38613), collected at Olango Island off Cebu City, measures 43.0 mm in height. The original description was accompanied by figures of the shell (Olivera, 2002, figs 2A1–3, E1–5) and a table of measurements; further paratypes are deposited in the National Museum of Natural History (Washington, D.C.) and the Academy of Natural Sciences (Philadelphia). As in other members of the Xenuroturris group, the marginal radular teeth are of the "duplex" type.

== Venom ==
Xenuroturris olangoensis (studied as Lophiotoma olangoensis) was the first turrid species for which the genes expressed in the venom duct were characterized on a broad scale. Watkins, Hillyard and Olivera (2006) sequenced 23 cDNA clones encoding putative toxins from the venom duct, which fell into 16 gene families. Only one of these gene families — an "I-like" family related to the I2 conotoxin superfamily that targets potassium channels — showed clear sequence similarity to any conotoxin gene family. Most of the putative toxins are cysteine-rich polypeptides, and a significant fraction exceed 80 amino acids in length, considerably larger than the 10–30 amino-acid conopeptides typical of cone snails; a minority are not cysteine-rich but contain hydrophobic amino-acid clusters interspersed with arginine residues. The peptides of this species are among those referred to as turritoxins, and the study suggested a common evolutionary origin with the cone snails (Conus) for one family of turrid toxins.

== Distribution ==
The type locality is Olango Island, off Cebu City, in the central Philippines. Occurrence records document the species from the Philippines — with numerous records from Olango and adjacent reefs — as well as from Vietnam, Indonesia and New Caledonia, with a single shell record from Kwajalein Atoll in the Marshall Islands. WoRMS also lists the species from the New Caledonian Exclusive Economic Zone. Specimens in the collection of the Muséum national d'histoire naturelle, Paris, were collected at depths of 0–10 m on Denajon Bank off Olango and at 15–20 m off Cebu.
