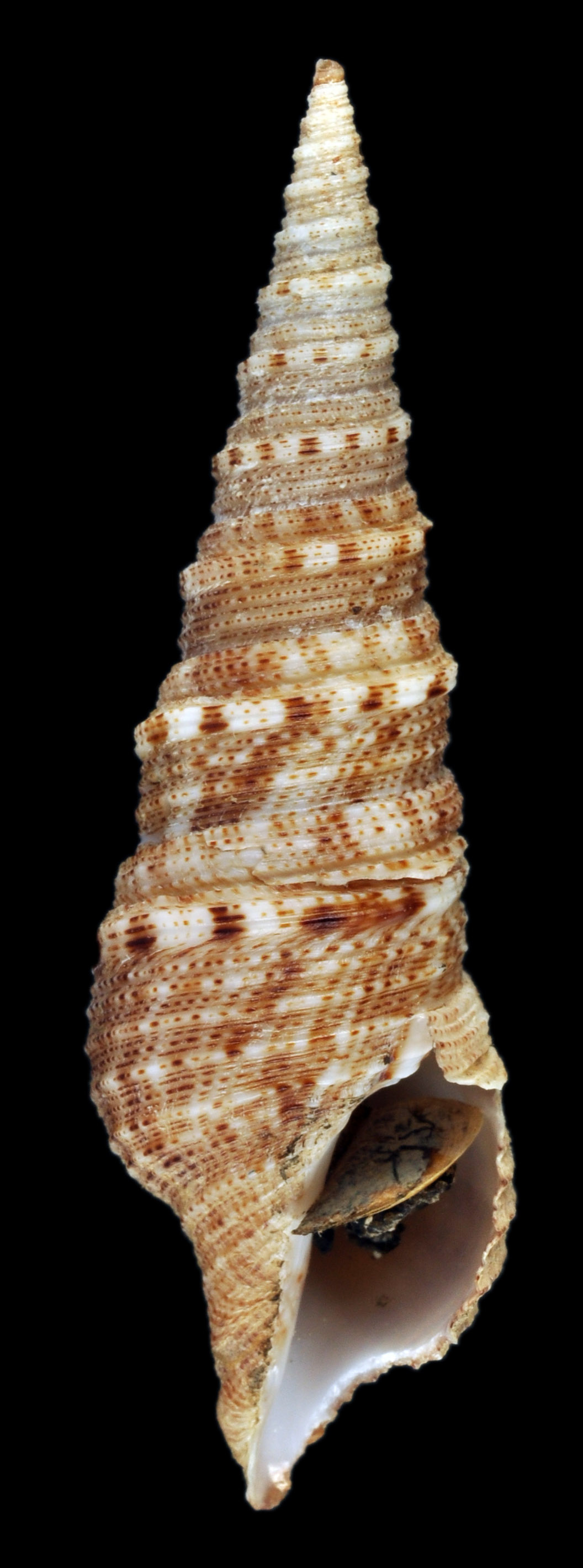
- Shell of Xenuroturris legitima (specimen at MNHN, Paris)

Scientific classification
- Kingdom: Animalia
- Phylum: Mollusca
- Class: Gastropoda
- Subclass: Caenogastropoda
- Order: Neogastropoda
- Family: Turridae
- Genus: Xenuroturris
- Species: X. legitima

Binomial name
- Xenuroturris legitima Iredale, 1929

= Xenuroturris legitima =

Species of gastropod

Xenuroturris legitima is a species of sea snail, a marine gastropod mollusk in the family Turridae, the turrids.

== Description ==
The length of the shell attains 72 mm, its diameter is 23 mm.

(Original description) The shell is large and awl-shaped, with a small aperture and a short, broad siphonal canal. The fasciole is deep, lies distant from the suture, and is followed by a strong ridge composed of three lines.

The shell is creamy white and thickly dotted with pale red-brown spots. The raised ridge is ornamented with darker, regularly spaced blotches. The sculpture consists of fine concentric lirae. On the antepenultimate whorl, about half a dozen lirae can be counted above the ridge and a dozen below it, with four being more prominent. The body whorl displays the same sculpture throughout, with seven lines predominating. Longitudinal sculpture is scarcely observable except under a good lens.

The columella is nearly straight. The inner lip bears a very thin glaze that extends across the body whorl. The outer lip is rather straight from the suture to the fasciole; below the fasciole, it sweeps forward and then recurves toward the short, open siphonal canal. The operculum is leaf-shaped, thick, and horny, with a terminal apex.

== Distribution ==
This marine species occurs off New Caledonia, the Loyalty Islands, Vanuatu, the Philippines, Vietnam, and Australia (Queensland).

== Uses ==
This marine species is usually eaten as a dish and delicacy, mainly in the Philippines.
