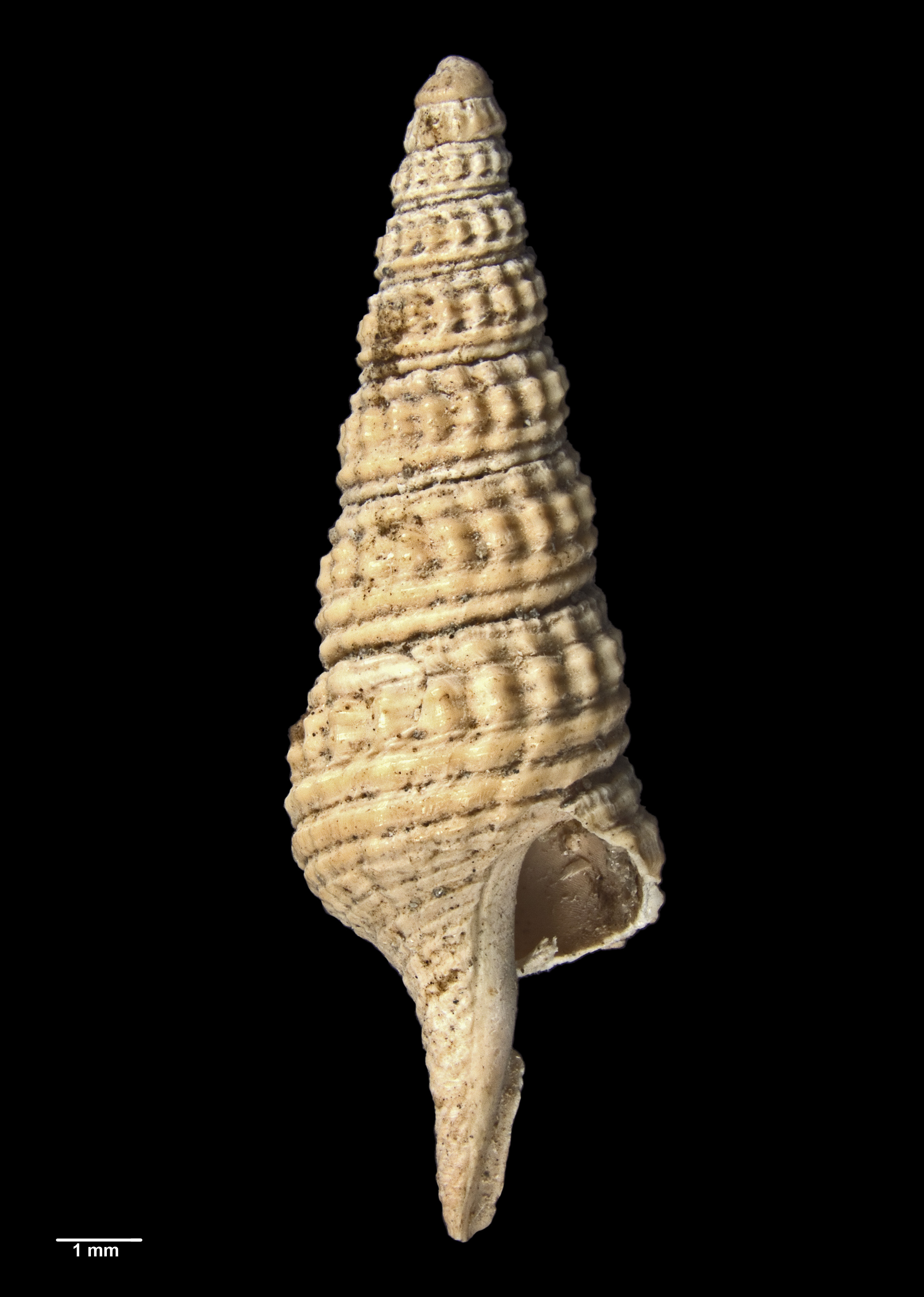
- Holotype of Veruturris bisculpta from Auckland War Memorial Museum

Scientific classification
- Kingdom: Animalia
- Phylum: Mollusca
- Class: Gastropoda
- Subclass: Caenogastropoda
- Order: Neogastropoda
- Family: incertae sedis
- Genus: †Veruturris
- Species: †V. bisculpta

Binomial name
- †Veruturris bisculpta (Powell, 1944)

Synonyms
- † Veruturris bisculptus Powell, 1944; † Xenuroturris bisculptus Powell, 1944; † Xenuroturris (Veruturris) bisculptus Powell, 1944

= Veruturris bisculpta =

Extinct species of gastropod

Veruturris bisculpta is an extinct species of marine gastropod mollusc in the superfamily Conoidea, currently unassigned to a family. Fossils of the species date to the middle Miocene, and are found in the St Vincent Basin of South Australia.

== Description ==
In the original description, Powell described the species' as follows:

Shell small, slender, with almost straight spire outlines. Sculptured in a curious manner—upper half of whorls with vertical fold-like axials, 17 per whorl, crossed by three spiral cords which are rendered nodulose by the axials—lower half of whorls with 2-3 heavy, closely spaced spirals. Base and anterior end with about 18 spirals, which are rendered rugose by moderately strong axial growth lines. Sinus "V" -shaped, not very deep, its apex on the upper half of the whorls. Length of anterior canal a little less than half total height of aperture. Protoconch broadly rounded, smooth, of two whorls, followed by almost a complete whorl of brephic axials.

While the holotype of the species measures 13.9 mm (0.55 in) in height and 4.5 mm (0.18 in) in diameter, and abnormally coiled specimen described by Powell measured 26.7 mm (1.05 in) in height and 6.5 mm (0.26 in) in diameter.

== Taxonomy ==
The species was first described by A.W.B. Powell in 1944 under the name Xenuroturris (Veruturris) bisculptus. When Veruturris was raised to genus level by Powell in 1964, the species began being referred to as Veruturris bisculptus or its currently accepted name, Veruturris bisculpta. The holotype was collected by Walter Howchin and J. C. Verco in 1919 from the Metropolitan Abattoirs Bore in Adelaide, Australia, and is held by the Auckland War Memorial Museum.

== Distribution ==
This extinct marine species occurs in middle Miocene (Bairnsdalian) strata of the St Vincent Basin, including the Dry Creek Sands Formation at a depth of between 122–152 m (400–499 ft).

== Gallery ==
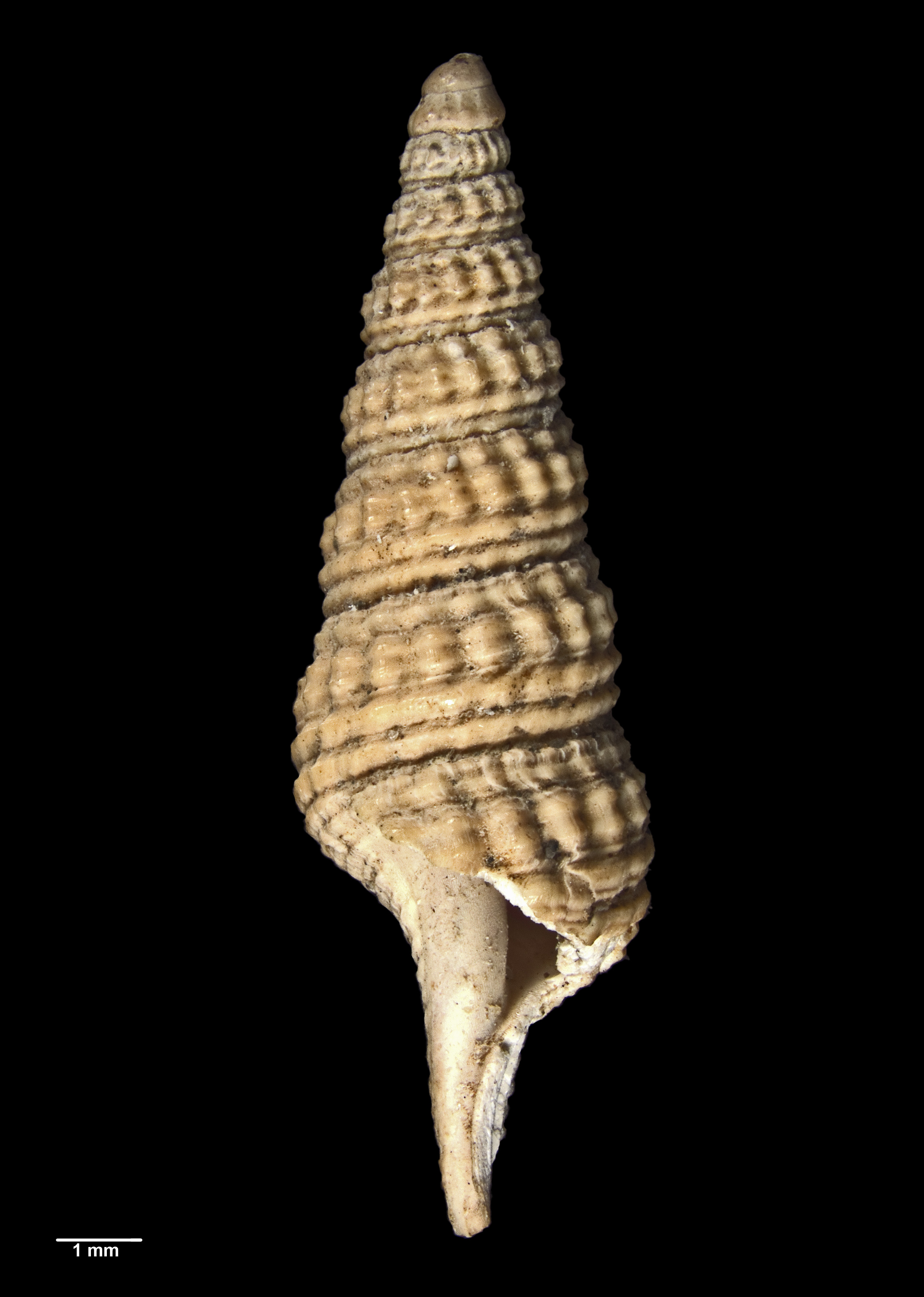
Side view of holotype

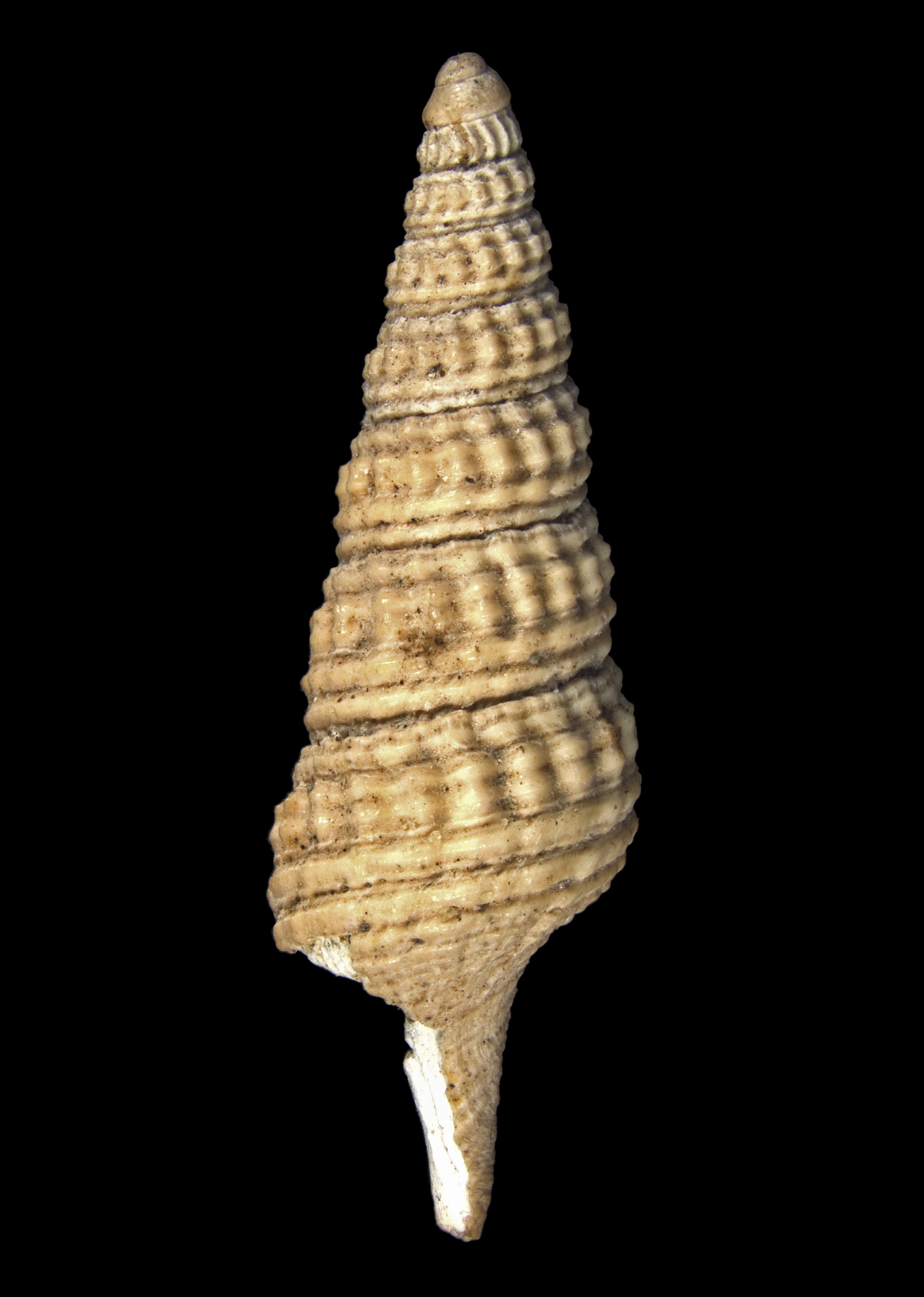
View of reverse side of holotype
