= Pseudogemmula gemmuloides =

Scientific classification
- Kingdom: Animalia
- Phylum: Mollusca
- Class: Gastropoda
- Subclass: Caenogastropoda
- Order: Neogastropoda
- Family: Turridae
- Genus: Pseudogemmula
- Species: P. gemmuloides

Binomial name
- Pseudogemmula gemmuloides (Powell, 1967)

Synonyms
- Xenuroturris gemmuloides A. W. B. Powell, 1967 superseded combination

Species of gastropod

Pseudogemmula gemmuloides is a species of sea snail, a marine gastropod mollusk in the family Turridae, the turrids.

== Description ==
The length of the shell attains 40 mm.

== Distribution ==
This marine species occurs off the Philippines and Hawaii.
