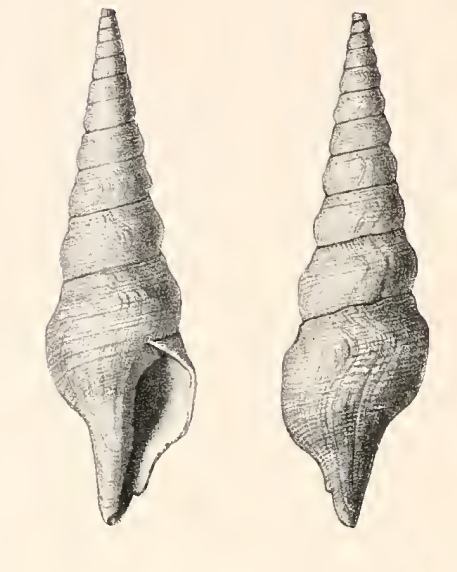
- Shell of Veruturris subconcavus (holotype)

Scientific classification
- Kingdom: Animalia
- Phylum: Mollusca
- Class: Gastropoda
- Subclass: Caenogastropoda
- Order: Neogastropoda
- Superfamily: Conoidea
- Family: incertae sedis
- Genus: †Veruturris
- Species: †V. subconcava

Binomial name
- †Veruturris subconcava (G.F. Harris, 1897)

Synonyms
- Turris subconcava (G.F. Harris, 1897); Pleurotoma subconcava G.F. Harris, 1897 (original combination); Veruturris subconcavus (G.F. Harris, 1897); † Xenuroturris subconcavus (G.F. Harris, 1897)

= Veruturris subconcava =

Species of gastropod

Veruturris subconcava is an extinct species of sea snail, a marine gastropod mollusk in an unassigned family in the Conoidea.

== Description ==
Dimensions: length 58 mm; breadth 16 mm; length of the aperture with siphonal canal 23 mm.

(Original description) The large shell is elongated. It contains 11 to 12 whorls. The later portion of the protoconch (the only part preserved in the type specimen) is distinctly longitudinally ribbed. Beyond the sinuous fracture denoting the commencement of the brephic stage these costae suddenly cease and give way to spiral lineations, with a prominent median sulcation indicating the position of the sinus. The whorls throughout the brephic and neanic stages are flat, with a deeply impressed suture, but in the adult stage they become convex, and have a postero-median subangulation at the periphery. Between this and the suture is a well-marked concave depression. The sculpture consists of closely-set spiral lineations, which are nearest together in the depression alluded to. The suture is margined by one or two lineations bolder than the rest. The lines of growth are fairly conspicuous, producing rough, irregular corrugations here and there. These are most noticeable in the neighbourhood of the peripheral subangulation, and on the anterior portion of the body whorl. The aperture is small, being about one-third the length of the whole shell, pyriform and produced in front. The outer lip is thin. The sinus is broad, arcuate and situated on the periphery. The columella is covered by a thin deposit of shell enamel, not callous posteriorly, slightly twisted in the middle. The siphonal canal is rather long and deep.

== Distribution ==
Fossils of this marine species were found in middle Miocene strata in Victoria and New South Wales, Australia.

== Gallery ==
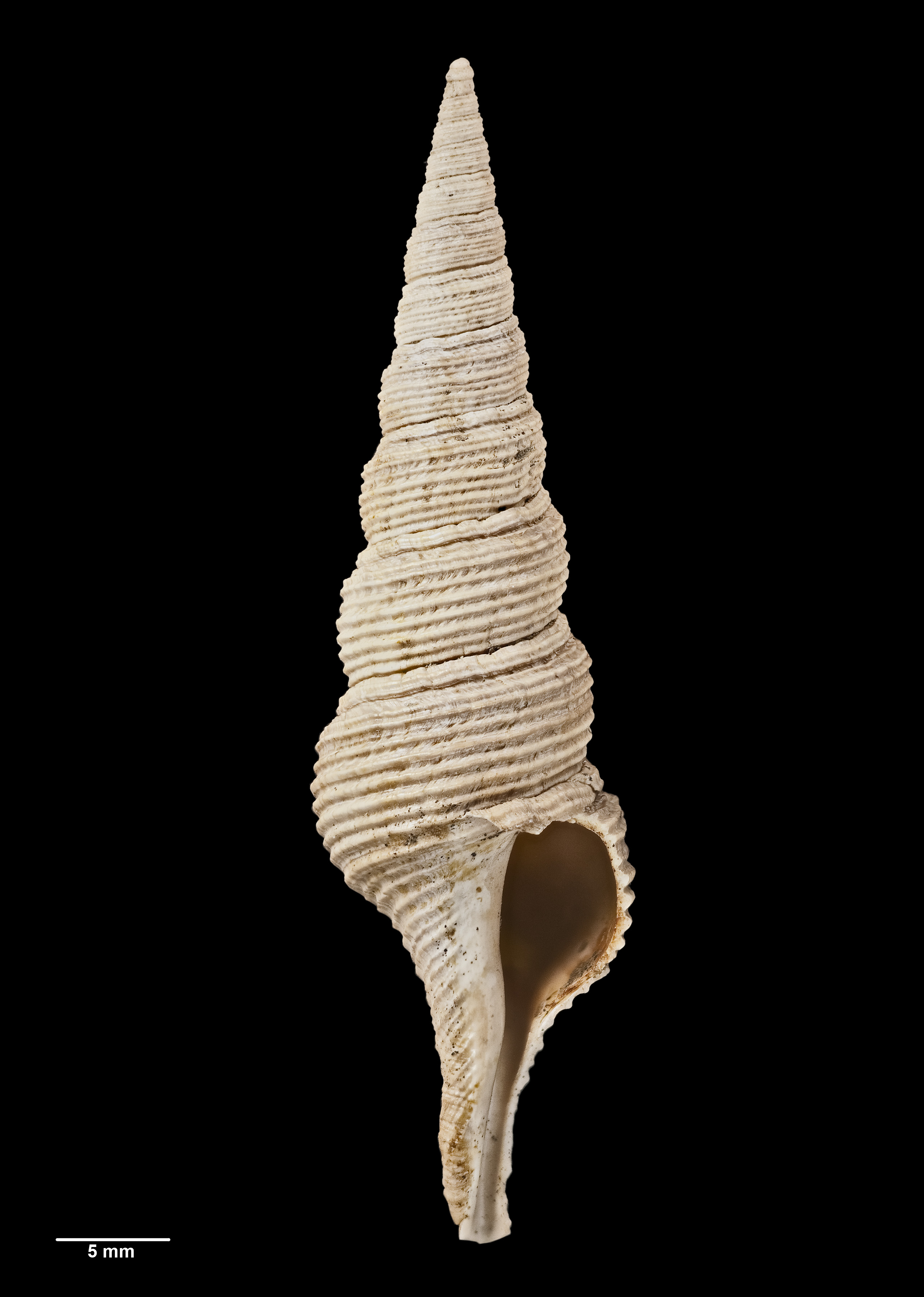
Type specimen (front view)

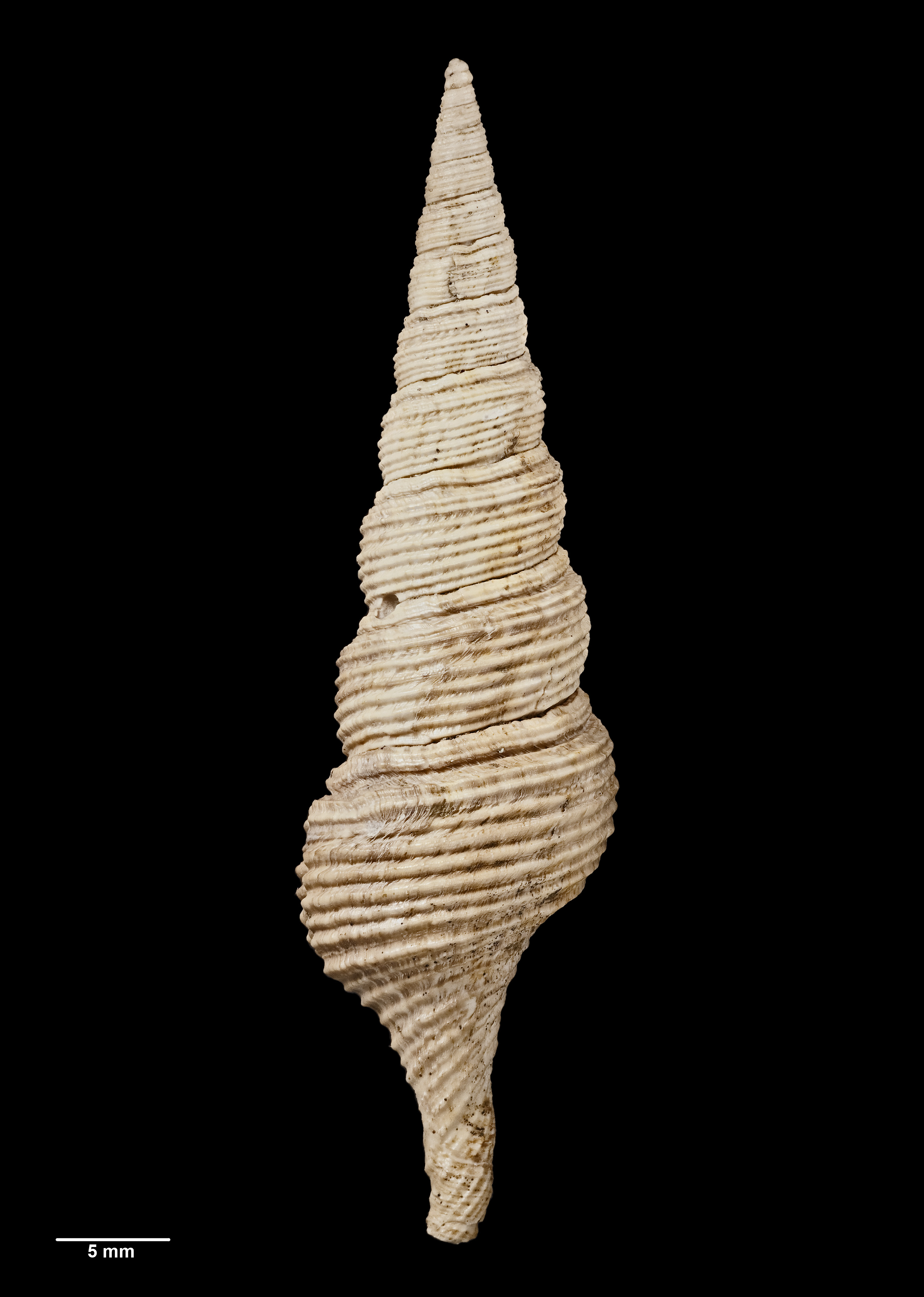
Type specimen (reverse view)
