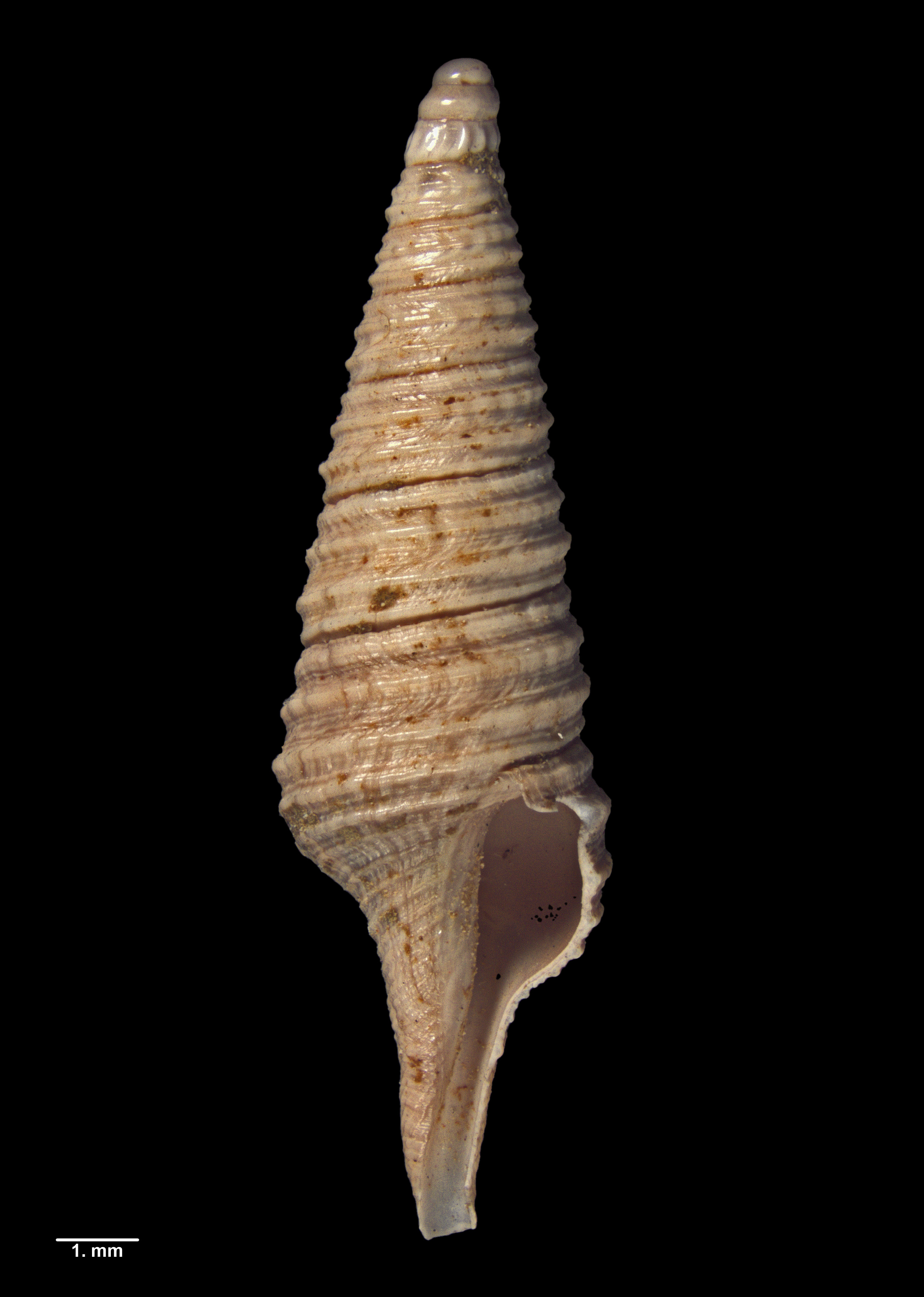
- Holotype of Veruturris quadricarinata from Auckland War Memorial Museum

Scientific classification
- Kingdom: Animalia
- Phylum: Mollusca
- Class: Gastropoda
- Subclass: Caenogastropoda
- Order: Neogastropoda
- Family: incertae sedis
- Genus: †Veruturris
- Species: †V. quadricarinata

Binomial name
- †Veruturris quadricarinata (Powell, 1944)

Synonyms
- † Xenuroturris (Veruturris) quadricarinatus Powell, 1944; † Xenuroturris quadricarinatus Powell, 1944; † Veruturris quadricarinatus Powell, 1944

= Veruturris quadricarinata =

Extinct species of gastropod

Veruturris quadricarinata is an extinct species of marine gastropod mollusc in the superfamily Conoidea, currently unassigned to a family. Fossils of the species date to the middle Miocene, and are found in the Port Phillip Basin, and the Muddy Creek Formation of Victoria, Australia.

== Description ==
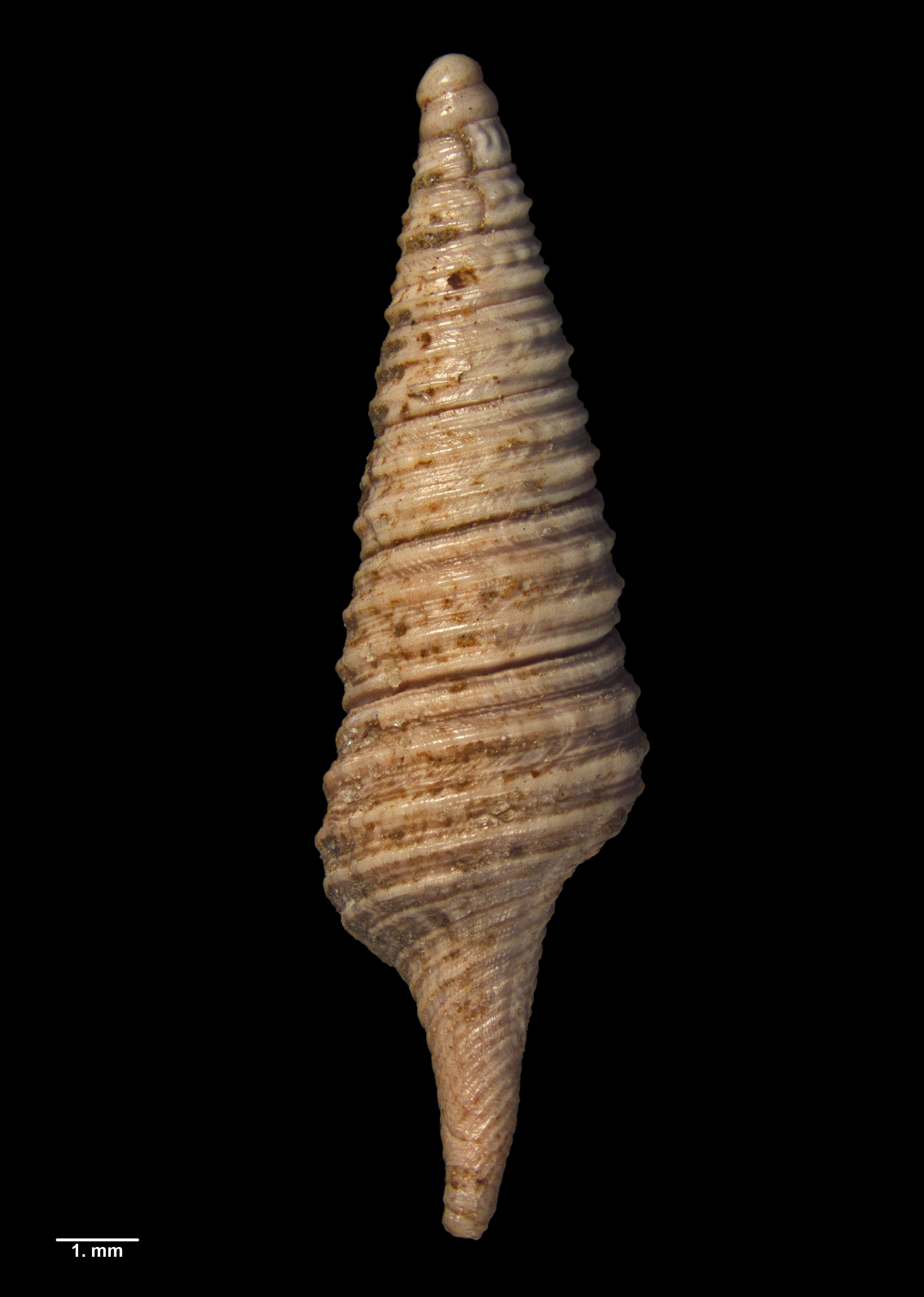
View of reverse side of holotype

In the original description, Powell described the species' as follows:

Shell small, resembling X. tatei except for the longer canal, and four spiral cords on the spire whorls instead of five. Protoconch blunt-tipped of 2½ smooth globose whorls plus a half whorl of brephic axials. Spire-whorls with four evenly spaced strong rounded cords, middle pair stronger than other two, which are at the sutures. There are 1-4 fine spiral threads in the interspaces. A fifth cord emerges from just beneath the top of the aperture, Below this there are about 18 much weaker cords on the base and anterior end. The anterior canal is slightly more than half the height of the complete aperture. Sinus broadly "V" shaped at its apex on the upper of the two median cords.

The holotype of the species measures 14.5 mm (0.57 in) in height and 4.2 mm (0.17 in) in diameter.

== Taxonomy ==
The species was first described by A.W.B. Powell in 1944 under the name Xenuroturris (Veruturris) quadricarinatus. When Veruturris was raised to genus level by Powell in 1964, the species began being referred to as Veruturris quadricarinatus or its currently accepted name, Veruturris quadricarinata. The holotype was collected from the Altona Shaft in Altona, Victoria on an unknown date prior to 1944, and is held by the Auckland War Memorial Museum.

== Distribution ==
This extinct marine species occurs in middle Miocene (Bairnsdalian) strata of the Gellibrand Formation of the Port Phillip Basin, and the Muddy Creek Formation of Clifton Bank, Hamilton, Victoria.
