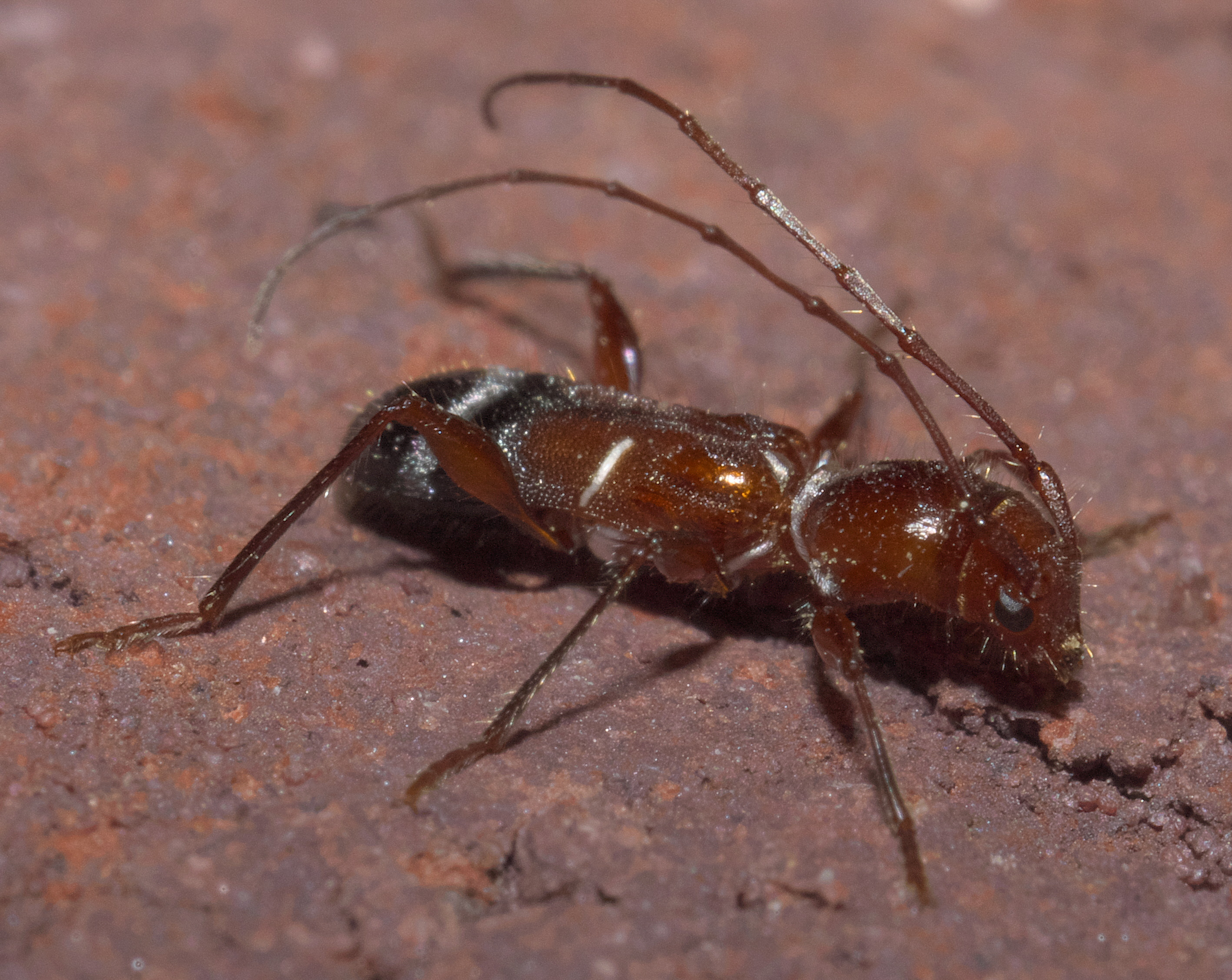
- Euderces pini

Scientific classification
- Kingdom: Animalia
- Phylum: Arthropoda
- Class: Insecta
- Order: Coleoptera
- Suborder: Polyphaga
- Infraorder: Cucujiformia
- Family: Cerambycidae
- Subfamily: Cerambycinae
- Tribe: Tillomorphini

= Tillomorphini =

Tribe of beetles

Tillomorphini is a tribe of beetles in the subfamily Cerambycinae, containing the following genera:

- Arawakia
- Bonfilsia
- Calliclytus
- Epipodocarpus
- Epropetes
- Euderces
- Gourbeyrella
- Lamproclytus
- Licracantha
- Mygalobas
- Pentanodes
- Tetranodus
- Tilloglomus
- Tillomorpha
