= T. spectabilis =

T. spectabilis may refer to:

- Tabanus spectabilis, a horsefly species
- Tahina spectabilis, a palm species
- Thomisus spectabilis, a crab spider species
- Tiariturris spectabilis, a sea snail species
- Tilloglomus spectabilis, a beetle species
- Tortyra spectabilis, a moth species
- Turris spectabilis, a sea snail species
