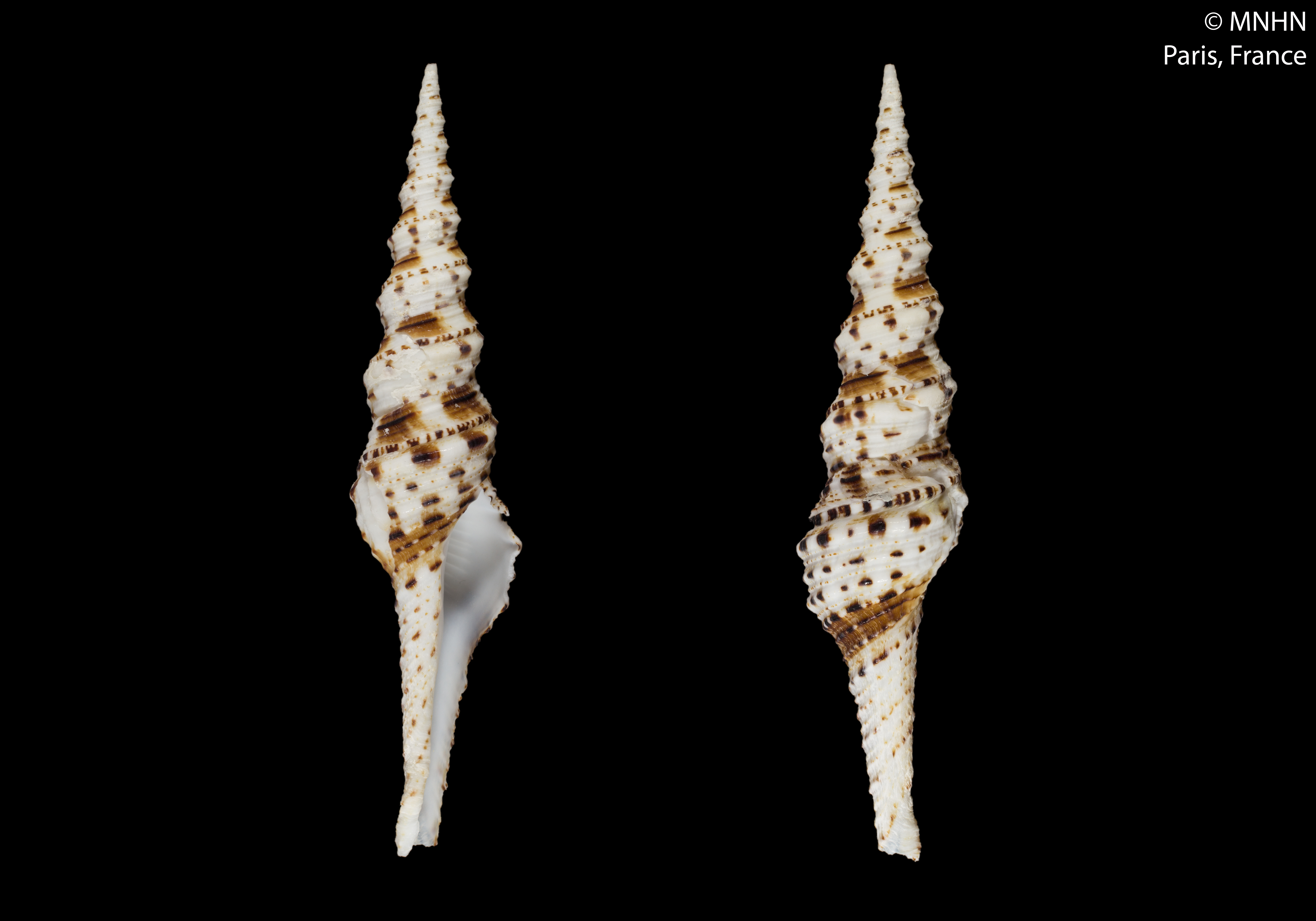
- Shell of Turris guidopoppei (holotype at MNHN, Paris)

Scientific classification
- Kingdom: Animalia
- Phylum: Mollusca
- Class: Gastropoda
- Subclass: Caenogastropoda
- Order: Neogastropoda
- Family: Turridae
- Genus: Turris
- Species: T. guidopoppei

Binomial name
- Turris guidopoppei Kilburn, Fedosov & B. M. Olivera, 2012

= Turris guidopoppei =

Species of gastropod

Turris guidopoppei is a species of sea snail, a marine gastropod mollusk in the family Turridae, the turrids.

== Description ==
The length of the shell attains 92.6 mm in the holotype (paratype: 77.8 mm). The species had historically been confused in the literature with the similarly Philippine-associated Turris garnonsii; the 2012 revision separated the two by designating a neotype for T. garnonsii from Zanzibar rather than the Philippines.

== Distribution ==
This marine species occurs off Cebu and Mindanao in the Philippines, at depths of 25–150 m. The holotype was collected off Olango Island, Cebu, at 44–73 m depth.
