= Tortyra malacozona =

Scientific classification
- Kingdom: Animalia
- Phylum: Arthropoda
- Class: Insecta
- Order: Lepidoptera
- Family: Choreutidae
- Genus: Tortyra
- Species: T. malacozona

Binomial name
- Tortyra malacozona Meyrick, 1922

Species of moth

Tortyra malacozona is a moth of the family Choreutidae. It is known from Peru and Costa Rica.

The wingspan is about 16 mm. The forewings are dark grey, with the tips of the scales white, forming a very close minute speckling. A black dot is found near the base in the middle, connected with the costa by a very fine strigula. There is a black dot near the dorsum at one-fifth and there is a fine slightly curved black transverse line at one-third. Near beyond this is a parallel rather dark fuscous streak. In the postmedian area are some irregularly placed fine black dashes and longitudinal lines of scales. The whitish speckling is absent towards the costa on apical third and there is a moderately broad violet terminal fascia, rather broader dorsally, the base of the scales dark and the tips light, forming a fine striation. The hindwings are dark fuscous.
