= Tillomorpha myrmicaria =

Scientific classification
- Kingdom: Animalia
- Phylum: Arthropoda
- Class: Insecta
- Order: Coleoptera
- Suborder: Polyphaga
- Infraorder: Cucujiformia
- Family: Cerambycidae
- Genus: Tillomorpha
- Species: T. myrmicaria

Binomial name
- Tillomorpha myrmicaria Fairmaire & Germain, 1859

Species of beetle

Tillomorpha myrmicaria is a species of beetle in the family Cerambycidae. It was described by Fairmaire and Germain in 1859.
