= Epropetes =

Scientific classification
- Kingdom: Animalia
- Phylum: Arthropoda
- Class: Insecta
- Order: Coleoptera
- Suborder: Polyphaga
- Infraorder: Cucujiformia
- Family: Cerambycidae
- Subfamily: Cerambycinae
- Tribe: Tillomorphini
- Genus: Epropetes; Bates, 1870

Genus of beetles

Epropetes is a genus of beetles in the family Cerambycidae, containing the following species:

- Epropetes amazonica Galileo & Martins, 2000
- Epropetes atlantica Martins, 1975
- Epropetes bolivianus Galileo & Martins, 2008
- Epropetes deterrima Martins & Napp, 1984
- Epropetes elongata Martins, 1975
- Epropetes hirsuta Martins & Napp, 1984
- Epropetes howdenorum Galileo & Martins, 2000
- Epropetes latifascia (White, 1855)
- Epropetes metallica Martins, 1975
- Epropetes ozodiformis Martins & Napp, 1984
- Epropetes serrana Martins & Napp, 1984
- Epropetes variabile Martins & Galileo, 2005
- Epropetes velutina Martins, 1975
- Epropetes zonula Martins & Napp, 1984
