= Tortyra chalcobathra =

Scientific classification
- Kingdom: Animalia
- Phylum: Arthropoda
- Class: Insecta
- Order: Lepidoptera
- Family: Choreutidae
- Genus: Tortyra
- Species: T. chalcobathra

Binomial name
- Tortyra chalcobathra Meyrick, 1922

Species of moth

Tortyra chalcobathra is a moth of the family Choreutidae. It is known from Brazil.

The wingspan is 11–13 mm. The forewings are blackish with a shining brassy wedge-shaped streak from the base of the costa above the dorsum to one/fifth, edged above with black on the costal half, beyond this a band of whitish speckling extending to the fascia. There is a moderately broad slightly curved shining brassy fascia at two-fifths, edged on each side with black, followed by a fascia of whitish speckling narrow on the dorsum, gradually expanded to above the middle, where it extends to three-fifths, then rapidly narrowed to the costa. A coppery-purple posterior patch, its edge convex, runs from the costa just before the apex to the dorsum beyond the middle. The hindwings are dark fuscous.
