= Tortyra chalcodes =

Scientific classification
- Domain: Eukaryota
- Kingdom: Animalia
- Phylum: Arthropoda
- Class: Insecta
- Order: Lepidoptera
- Family: Choreutidae
- Genus: Tortyra
- Species: T. chalcodes

Binomial name
- Tortyra chalcodes Walsingham, 1914

Species of moth

Tortyra chalcodes is a moth of the family Choreutidae. It is known from Costa Rica and Mexico.
