= Tortyra aurofasciana =

Scientific classification
- Kingdom: Animalia
- Phylum: Arthropoda
- Class: Insecta
- Order: Lepidoptera
- Family: Choreutidae
- Genus: Tortyra
- Species: T. aurofasciana

Binomial name
- Tortyra aurofasciana (Snellen, 1875)

Synonyms
- Simaethis aurofasciana Snellen, 1875

Species of moth

Tortyra aurofasciana is a moth of the family Choreutidae. It is known from the West Indies.
