= Tetranodus reticeps =

Scientific classification
- Kingdom: Animalia
- Phylum: Arthropoda
- Clade: Pancrustacea
- Class: Insecta
- Order: Coleoptera
- Suborder: Polyphaga
- Infraorder: Cucujiformia
- Family: Cerambycidae
- Genus: Tetranodus
- Species: T. reticeps

Binomial name
- Tetranodus reticeps (Bates, 1880)

Species of beetle

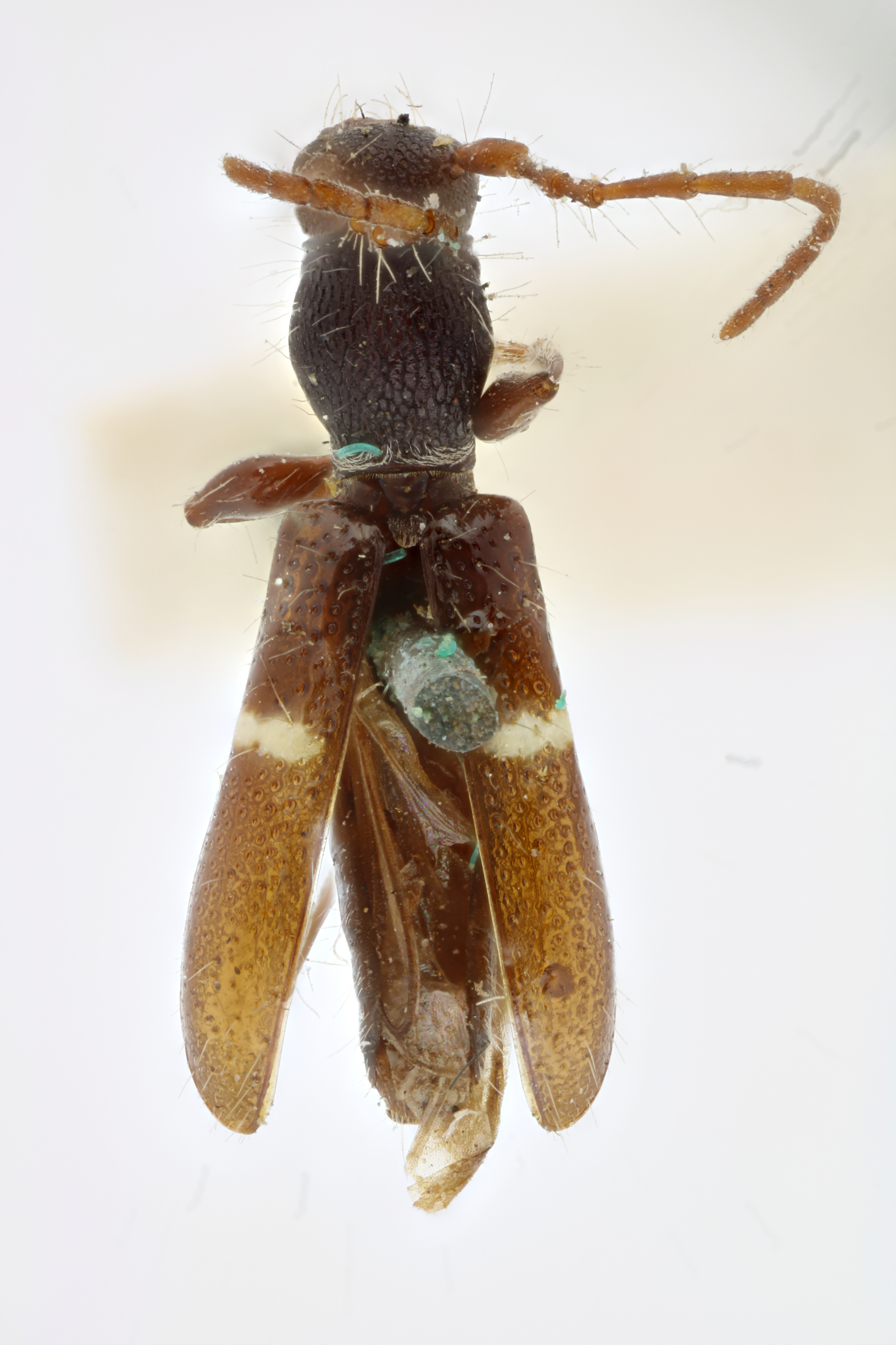

Tetranodus reticeps is a species of beetle in the family Cerambycidae. It was described by Bates in 1880.
