= Tortyra aenescens =

Scientific classification
- Domain: Eukaryota
- Kingdom: Animalia
- Phylum: Arthropoda
- Class: Insecta
- Order: Lepidoptera
- Family: Choreutidae
- Genus: Tortyra
- Species: T. aenescens

Binomial name
- Tortyra aenescens (Dognin, 1905)

Synonyms
- Choregia aenescens Dognin, 1905

Species of moth

Tortyra aenescens is a moth of the family Choreutidae. It is known from Ecuador.
