= Tortyra orphnophanes =

Scientific classification
- Kingdom: Animalia
- Phylum: Arthropoda
- Class: Insecta
- Order: Lepidoptera
- Family: Choreutidae
- Genus: Tortyra
- Species: T. orphnophanes

Binomial name
- Tortyra orphnophanes Meyrick, 1932

Species of moth

Tortyra orphnophanes is a moth of the family Choreutidae. It is known from Peru.
