= Bonfilsia tricolor =

Scientific classification
- Kingdom: Animalia
- Phylum: Arthropoda
- Class: Insecta
- Order: Coleoptera
- Suborder: Polyphaga
- Infraorder: Cucujiformia
- Family: Cerambycidae
- Genus: Bonfilsia
- Species: B. tricolor

Binomial name
- Bonfilsia tricolor Villiers, 1979

Species of beetle

Bonfilsia tricolor is a species of beetle in the family Cerambycidae. It was described by Villiers in 1979.
