= Pentanodes =

Scientific classification
- Kingdom: Animalia
- Phylum: Arthropoda
- Class: Insecta
- Order: Coleoptera
- Suborder: Polyphaga
- Infraorder: Cucujiformia
- Family: Cerambycidae
- Tribe: Tillomorphini
- Genus: Pentanodes

Genus of beetles

Pentanodes is a genus of beetles in the family Cerambycidae, containing the following species:

- Pentanodes albofasciatus Fisher, 1932
- Pentanodes dietzii Schaeffer, 1904
