= Tortyra cantharodes =

Scientific classification
- Kingdom: Animalia
- Phylum: Arthropoda
- Clade: Pancrustacea
- Class: Insecta
- Order: Lepidoptera
- Family: Choreutidae
- Genus: Tortyra
- Species: T. cantharodes

Binomial name
- Tortyra cantharodes Meyrick, 1922

Species of moth

Tortyra cantharodes is a species of moth belonging to the family Choreutidae. It is native to Peru.

The moth has a wingspan of about 18 mm. The fore-wings are metallic-green, with strong coppery-purple reflection. Near the base, there is a slight black strigula originating from the costa. Additionally, there is a narrow almost straight iridescent-blue-metallic fascia located before the middle, edged on each side with blackish borders, followed by a narrow even fascia of dark fuscous whitish-tipped scales, the posterior somewhat broader. The hindwings are characterized by a dark fuscous coloration.
