= Pentanodes albofasciatus =

Scientific classification
- Kingdom: Animalia
- Phylum: Arthropoda
- Class: Insecta
- Order: Coleoptera
- Suborder: Polyphaga
- Infraorder: Cucujiformia
- Family: Cerambycidae
- Genus: Pentanodes
- Species: P. albofasciatus

Binomial name
- Pentanodes albofasciatus Fisher, 1932

Species of beetle

Pentanodes albofasciatus is a species of beetle in the family Cerambycidae. It was described by Fisher in 1932.
