= Tortyra ignita =

Scientific classification
- Kingdom: Animalia
- Phylum: Arthropoda
- Clade: Pancrustacea
- Class: Insecta
- Order: Lepidoptera
- Family: Choreutidae
- Genus: Tortyra
- Species: T. ignita

Binomial name
- Tortyra ignita (Zeller, 1877)

Synonyms
- Choregia ignita Zeller, 1877

Species of moth

Tortyra ignita is a moth of the family Choreutidae. It is known from Cuba.
