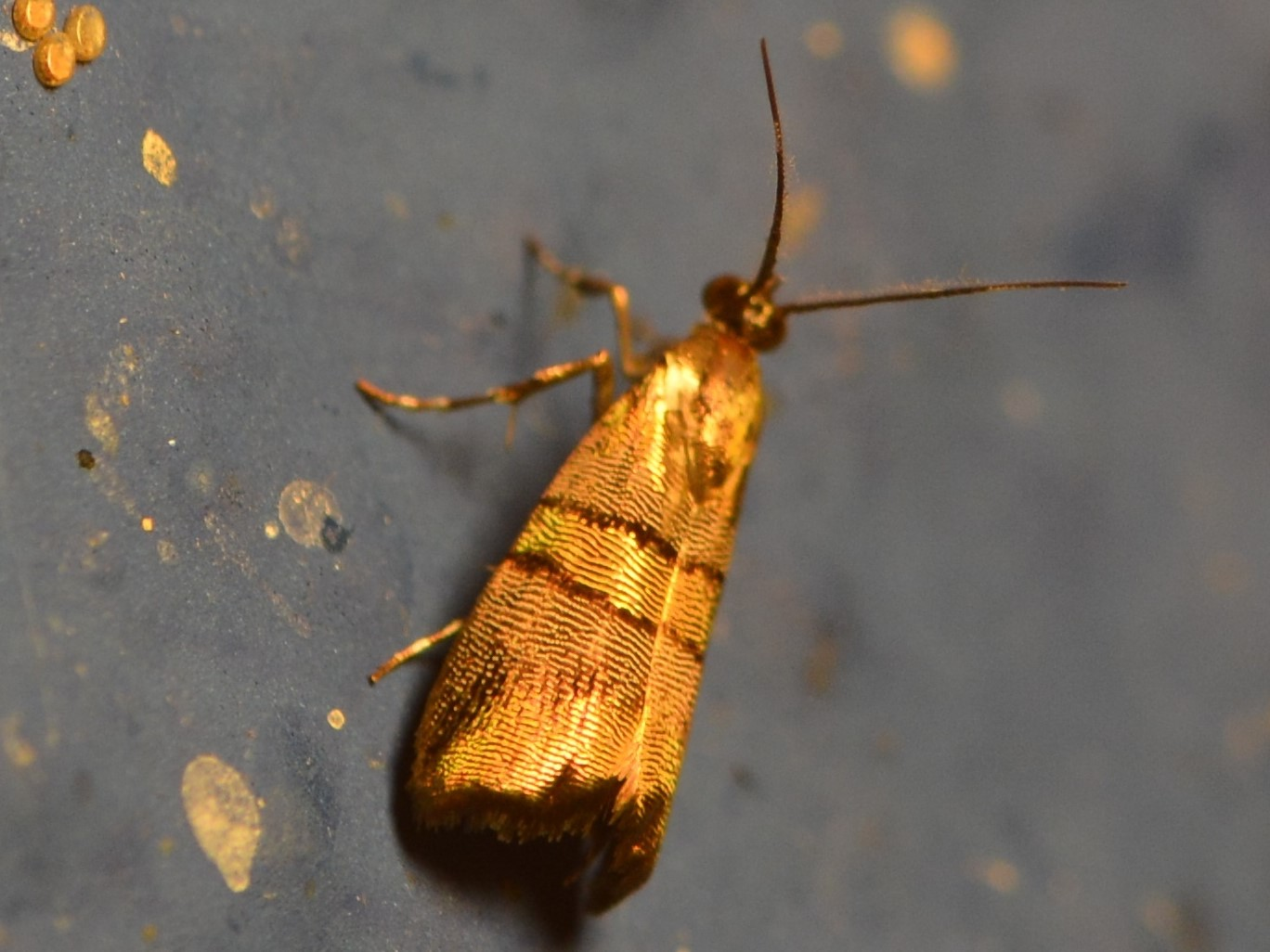

Scientific classification
- Kingdom: Animalia
- Phylum: Arthropoda
- Class: Insecta
- Order: Lepidoptera
- Family: Choreutidae
- Genus: Tortyra
- Species: T. auriferalis

Binomial name
- Tortyra auriferalis (Walker), 1863

= Tortyra auriferalis =

Species of moth

Tortyra auriferalis is a moth of the family Choreutidae. It is known from the West Indies.
