= Bonfilsia =

Scientific classification
- Kingdom: Animalia
- Phylum: Arthropoda
- Class: Insecta
- Order: Coleoptera
- Suborder: Polyphaga
- Infraorder: Cucujiformia
- Family: Cerambycidae
- Tribe: Tillomorphini
- Genus: Bonfilsia

Genus of beetles

Bonfilsia is a genus of beetles in the family Cerambycidae, containing the following species:

- Bonfilsia pejoti Chalumeau & Touroult, 2004
- Bonfilsia tricolor Villiers, 1979
