= Tillomorpha lineoligera =

Scientific classification
- Kingdom: Animalia
- Phylum: Arthropoda
- Class: Insecta
- Order: Coleoptera
- Suborder: Polyphaga
- Infraorder: Cucujiformia
- Family: Cerambycidae
- Genus: Tillomorpha
- Species: T. lineoligera

Binomial name
- Tillomorpha lineoligera Blanchard in Gay, 1851

Species of beetle

Tillomorpha lineoligera is a species of beetle in the family Cerambycidae. It was described by Blanchard in 1851.
