= Gourbeyrella =

Scientific classification
- Kingdom: Animalia
- Phylum: Arthropoda
- Clade: Pancrustacea
- Class: Insecta
- Order: Coleoptera
- Suborder: Polyphaga
- Infraorder: Cucujiformia
- Family: Cerambycidae
- Tribe: Tillomorphini
- Genus: Gourbeyrella

Genus of beetles

Gourbeyrella is a genus of beetles in the family Cerambycidae containing the following species:

- Gourbeyrella alexisi Chalumeau & Touroult, 2004
- Gourbeyrella madininae Chalumeau & Touroult, 2004
- Gourbeyrella romanowskii (Fleutiaux & Salle, 1889)
