= Calliclytus macoris =

Scientific classification
- Kingdom: Animalia
- Phylum: Arthropoda
- Class: Insecta
- Order: Coleoptera
- Suborder: Polyphaga
- Infraorder: Cucujiformia
- Family: Cerambycidae
- Genus: Calliclytus
- Species: C. macoris

Binomial name
- Calliclytus macoris Lingafelter, 2011

Species of beetle

Calliclytus macoris is a species of beetle in the family Cerambycidae. It was described by Lingafelter in 2011.
