= Epropetes amazonica =

Scientific classification
- Kingdom: Animalia
- Phylum: Arthropoda
- Class: Insecta
- Order: Coleoptera
- Suborder: Polyphaga
- Infraorder: Cucujiformia
- Family: Cerambycidae
- Genus: Epropetes
- Species: E. amazonica

Binomial name
- Epropetes amazonica Galileo & Martins, 2000

Species of beetle

Epropetes amazonica is a species of beetle in the family Cerambycidae. It was described by Galileo and Martins in 2000.
