= Tillomorpha =

Scientific classification
- Kingdom: Animalia
- Phylum: Arthropoda
- Class: Insecta
- Order: Coleoptera
- Suborder: Polyphaga
- Infraorder: Cucujiformia
- Family: Cerambycidae
- Tribe: Tillomorphini
- Genus: Tillomorpha

Genus of beetles

Tillomorpha is a genus of beetles in the family Cerambycidae, containing the following species:

- Tillomorpha lineoligera Blanchard in Gay, 1851
- Tillomorpha myrmicaria Fairmaire & Germain, 1859
