= Gourbeyrella romanowskii =

Scientific classification
- Kingdom: Animalia
- Phylum: Arthropoda
- Class: Insecta
- Order: Coleoptera
- Suborder: Polyphaga
- Infraorder: Cucujiformia
- Family: Cerambycidae
- Genus: Gourbeyrella
- Species: G. romanowskii

Binomial name
- Gourbeyrella romanowskii (Fleutiaux & Salle, 1889)

Species of beetle

Gourbeyrella romanowskii is a species of beetle in the family Cerambycidae. It was described by Fleutiaux and Salle in 1889.
