= Epropetes hirsuta =

Scientific classification
- Kingdom: Animalia
- Phylum: Arthropoda
- Class: Insecta
- Order: Coleoptera
- Suborder: Polyphaga
- Infraorder: Cucujiformia
- Family: Cerambycidae
- Genus: Epropetes
- Species: E. hirsuta

Binomial name
- Epropetes hirsuta Martins & Napp, 1984

Species of beetle

Epropetes hirsuta is a species of beetle in the family Cerambycidae. It was described by Martins and Napp in 1984.
