= Epropetes bolivianus =

Scientific classification
- Kingdom: Animalia
- Phylum: Arthropoda
- Class: Insecta
- Order: Coleoptera
- Suborder: Polyphaga
- Infraorder: Cucujiformia
- Family: Cerambycidae
- Genus: Epropetes
- Species: E. bolivianus

Binomial name
- Epropetes bolivianus Galileo & Martins, 2008

Species of beetle

Epropetes bolivianus is a species of beetle in the family Cerambycidae. It was described by Galileo and Martins in 2008.
