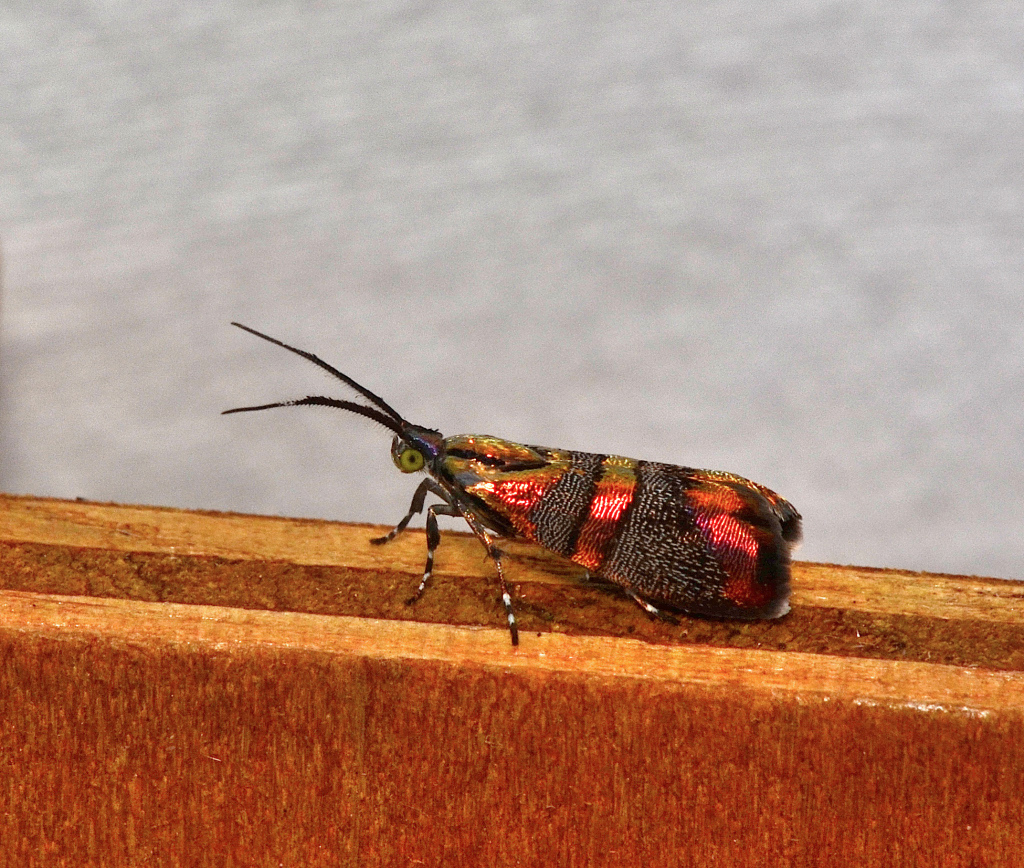

Scientific classification
- Domain: Eukaryota
- Kingdom: Animalia
- Phylum: Arthropoda
- Class: Insecta
- Order: Lepidoptera
- Family: Choreutidae
- Genus: Tortyra
- Species: T. slossonia

Binomial name
- Tortyra slossonia (Fernald, 1900)

Synonyms
- Walsinghamia slossonia Fernald, 1900

= Tortyra slossonia =

Species of moth

Tortyra slossonia, commonly known as the reflective tortyra moth, ficus budworm or Slosson's metalmark moth, is a moth of the family Choreutidae. It is known from Florida.

The wingspan is about 13 mm.

== Etymology ==
It is named for entomologist Annie Trumbull Slosson.
