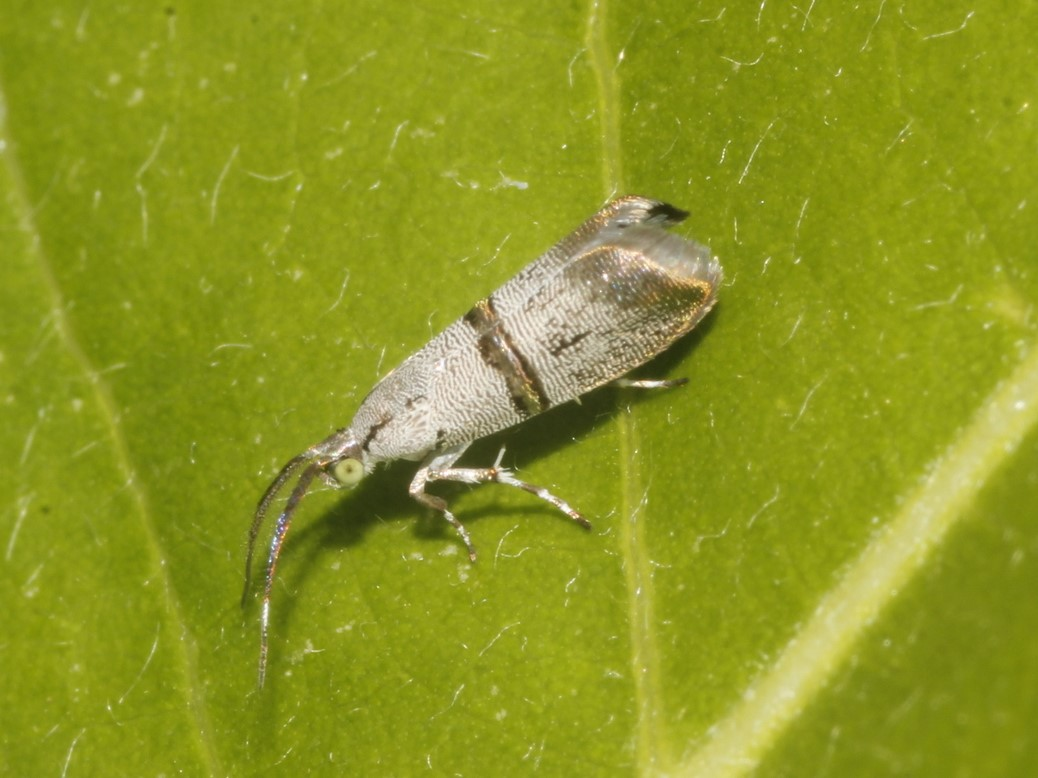

Scientific classification
- Kingdom: Animalia
- Phylum: Arthropoda
- Class: Insecta
- Order: Lepidoptera
- Family: Choreutidae
- Genus: Tortyra
- Species: T. hyalozona

Binomial name
- Tortyra hyalozona Meyrick, 1912

= Tortyra hyalozona =

Species of moth

Tortyra hyalozona is a moth of the family Choreutidae. It is known from Colombia.
