= Tiariturris oschneri =

Scientific classification
- Kingdom: Animalia
- Phylum: Mollusca
- Class: Gastropoda
- Subclass: Caenogastropoda
- Order: Neogastropoda
- Superfamily: Conoidea
- Family: Pseudomelatomidae
- Genus: Tiariturris
- Species: †T. oschneri

Binomial name
- †Tiariturris oschneri (Anderson and Martin 1914)

Synonyms
- † Surcula oschneri Anderson and Martin 1914

Extinct species of gastropod

Tiariturris oschneri is an extinct species of small sea snail, a marine gastropod mollusk in the family Pseudomelatomidae, the turrids and allies.
