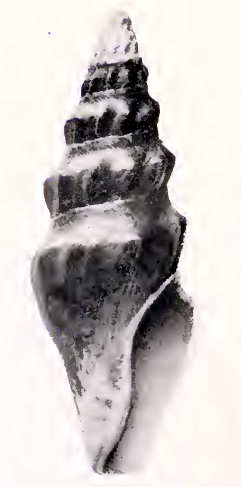
- Original image of a shell of Tiariturris libya

Scientific classification
- Kingdom: Animalia
- Phylum: Mollusca
- Class: Gastropoda
- Subclass: Caenogastropoda
- Order: Neogastropoda
- Superfamily: Conoidea
- Family: Pseudomelatomidae
- Genus: Tiariturris
- Species: T. libya

Binomial name
- Tiariturris libya (Dall, 1919)

Synonyms
- Turricula libya Dall, 1919

= Tiariturris libya =

Species of gastropod

Tiariturris libya is a species of small sea snail, a marine gastropod mollusk in the family Pseudomelatomidae.

== Description ==
The length of the shell varies between 50 mm and 65 mm.

(Original description) The solid shell is fusiform. The apex is eroded. The surface is white, covered with a blackish olive periostracum. The shell has about seven (decollate) whorls. The suture is strongly appressed and obscure. The anal fasciole is wide, smooth and concave. The sulcus is wide and shallow, close to the suture. The spiral sculpture consists of a few feeble threads on the earlier whorls. The axial sculpture consists of (on the penultimate whorl nine or ten. on the body whorl only three or four) short prominent riblets extending from the fasciole protractively forward to the succeeding suture on the spire. On the body whorl there is on the later part only an angle at the anterior edge of the fasciole. The base is moderately convex. The aperture is narrow, with a deep anal sulcus and a prominently arcuate, thin, sharp-edged outer lip. The inner lip shows a thin layer of white callus. The columella is thick and solid, attenuated in front. The axis is not pervious. The siphonal canal is short, wide and not recurved.

== Distribution ==
This marine species occurs from Baja California, Mexico to Peru.
