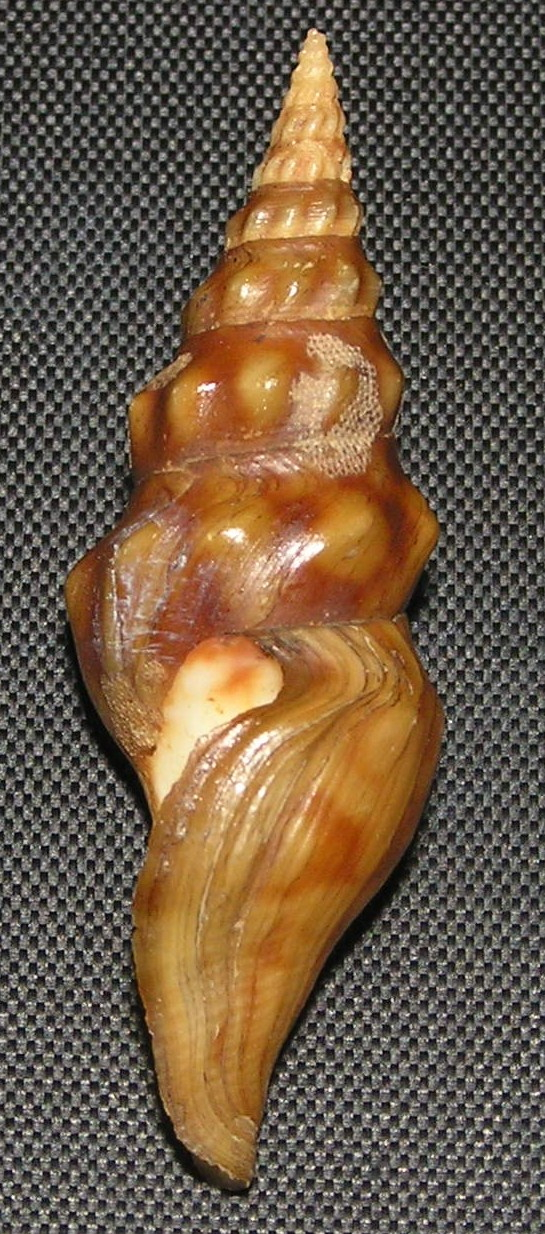
- Shell of Tiariturris spectabilis

Scientific classification
- Kingdom: Animalia
- Phylum: Mollusca
- Class: Gastropoda
- Subclass: Caenogastropoda
- Order: Neogastropoda
- Superfamily: Conoidea
- Family: Pseudomelatomidae
- Genus: Tiariturris; Berry, 1958

Type species
- Pleurotoma olivacea Sowerby I, 1834 a

Species
- See text

= Tiariturris =

Genus of gastropods

Tiariturris is a genus of small predatory sea snails, marine gastropod mollusks in the family Pseudomelatomidae. This species was discovered in the gulf of Panama in 1958 by Berry.

== Species ==
Species within the genus Tiariturris include:

- Tiariturris libya (Dall, 1919)
- † Tiariturris oschneri (Anderson & Martin, 1914)
- Tiariturris spectabilis Berry, 1958
