= Tortyra iocyaneus =

Scientific classification
- Kingdom: Animalia
- Phylum: Arthropoda
- Clade: Pancrustacea
- Class: Insecta
- Order: Lepidoptera
- Family: Choreutidae
- Genus: Tortyra
- Species: T. iocyaneus

Binomial name
- Tortyra iocyaneus Heppner, 1991

Species of moth

Tortyra iocyaneus is a moth of the family Choreutidae. It is known from Florida, United States.

The wingspan is about 14 mm.
