= Tortyra argentifascia =

Scientific classification
- Domain: Eukaryota
- Kingdom: Animalia
- Phylum: Arthropoda
- Class: Insecta
- Order: Lepidoptera
- Family: Choreutidae
- Genus: Tortyra
- Species: T. argentifascia

Binomial name
- Tortyra argentifascia Walsingham, 1914

Species of moth

Tortyra argentifascia is a species of moth of the family Choreutidae found in Mexico.
