= Epropetes atlantica =

Scientific classification
- Kingdom: Animalia
- Phylum: Arthropoda
- Clade: Pancrustacea
- Class: Insecta
- Order: Coleoptera
- Suborder: Polyphaga
- Infraorder: Cucujiformia
- Family: Cerambycidae
- Genus: Epropetes
- Species: E. atlantica

Binomial name
- Epropetes atlantica Martins, 1975

Species of beetle

Epropetes atlantica is a species of beetle in the family Cerambycidae. It was described by Martins in 1975. It is found in Brazil (Minas Gerais, Rio de Janeiro, São Paulo, Paraná, Santa Catarina).
