= Tetranodus angulicollis =

Scientific classification
- Kingdom: Animalia
- Phylum: Arthropoda
- Class: Insecta
- Order: Coleoptera
- Suborder: Polyphaga
- Infraorder: Cucujiformia
- Family: Cerambycidae
- Genus: Tetranodus
- Species: T. angulicollis

Binomial name
- Tetranodus angulicollis Chemsak, 1969

Species of beetle

Tetranodus angulicollis is a species of beetle in the family Cerambycidae. It was described by Chemsak in 1969.
