= Pentanodes dietzii =

Scientific classification
- Kingdom: Animalia
- Phylum: Arthropoda
- Class: Insecta
- Order: Coleoptera
- Suborder: Polyphaga
- Infraorder: Cucujiformia
- Family: Cerambycidae
- Genus: Pentanodes
- Species: P. dietzii

Binomial name
- Pentanodes dietzii Schaeffer, 1904

Species of beetle

Pentanodes dietzii is a species of beetle in the family Cerambycidae. It was described by Schaeffer in 1904.
