= Tortyra violacea =

Scientific classification
- Domain: Eukaryota
- Kingdom: Animalia
- Phylum: Arthropoda
- Class: Insecta
- Order: Lepidoptera
- Family: Choreutidae
- Genus: Tortyra
- Species: T. violacea

Binomial name
- Tortyra violacea (C. Felder, R. Felder & Rogenhofer, 1875)

Synonyms
- Choregia violacea C. Felder, R. Felder & Rogenhofer, 1875

Species of moth

Tortyra violacea is a moth of the family Choreutidae. It is known from Brazil.
