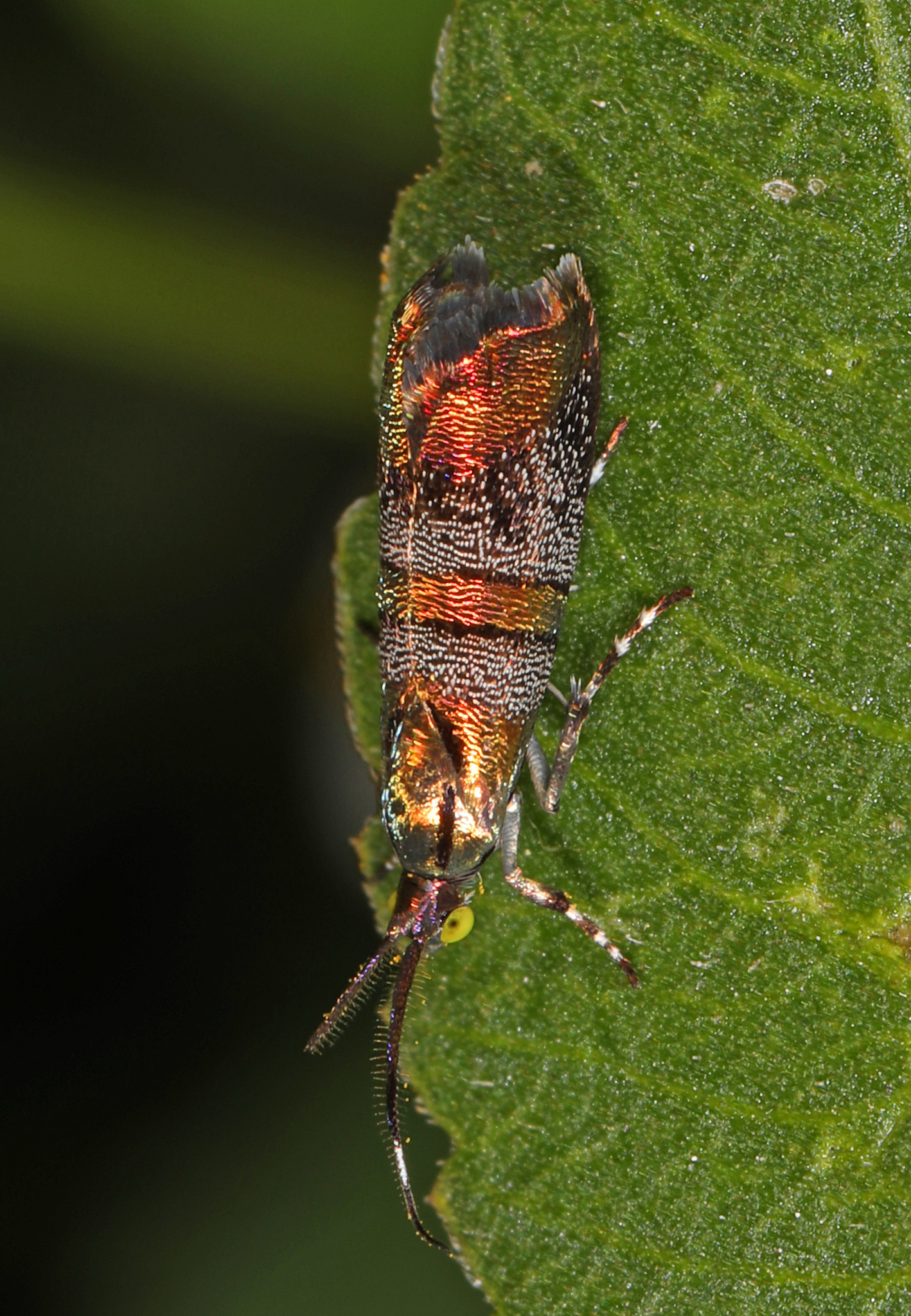
- Tortyra slossonia

Scientific classification
- Kingdom: Animalia
- Phylum: Arthropoda
- Class: Insecta
- Order: Lepidoptera
- Family: Choreutidae
- Genus: Tortyra; Walker, 1863

Synonyms
- Choregia Zeller, 1877; Walsinghamia Riley, 1889

= Tortyra =

Genus of moths

Tortyra is a genus of moths in the family Choreutidae.

== Species ==
- Tortyra aenescens (Dognin, 1905)
- Tortyra argentifascia Walsingham, 1914
- Tortyra auriferalis Walker, 1863
- Tortyra aurofasciana (Snellen, 1875)
- Tortyra cantharodes Meyrick, 1922
- Tortyra caracasiae Amsel, 1956-1957
- Tortyra chalcobathra Meyrick, 1922
- Tortyra chalcodes Walsingham, 1914
- Tortyra cuprinella Busck, 1914
- Tortyra ferratella Busck, 1914
- Tortyra fulgens (C. Felder, R. Felder & Rogenhofer, 1875)
- Tortyra hoguella Heppner, 1981
- Tortyra hyalozona Meyrick, 1912
- Tortyra ignita (Zeller, 1877)
- Tortyra iocyaneus Heppner, 1991
- Tortyra malacozona Meyrick, 1922
- Tortyra orphnophanes Meyrick, 1932
- Tortyra rhodoclaena Meyrick, 1930
- Tortyra slossonia (Fernald, 1900)
- Tortyra spectabilis Walker, 1863
- Tortyra sporodelta Meyrick, 1922
- Tortyra violacea (C. Felder, R. Felder & Rogenhofer, 1875)
- Tortyra vividis Busck, 1934
