= Gourbeyrella alexisi =

Scientific classification
- Kingdom: Animalia
- Phylum: Arthropoda
- Class: Insecta
- Order: Coleoptera
- Suborder: Polyphaga
- Infraorder: Cucujiformia
- Family: Cerambycidae
- Genus: Gourbeyrella
- Species: G. alexisi

Binomial name
- Gourbeyrella alexisi Chalumeau & Touroult, 2004

Species of beetle

Gourbeyrella alexisi is a species of beetle in the family Cerambycidae. It was described by Chalumeau and Touroult in 2004.
