= Calliclytus =

Scientific classification
- Kingdom: Animalia
- Phylum: Arthropoda
- Clade: Pancrustacea
- Class: Insecta
- Order: Coleoptera
- Suborder: Polyphaga
- Infraorder: Cucujiformia
- Family: Cerambycidae
- Tribe: Tillomorphini
- Genus: Calliclytus

Genus of beetles

Calliclytus is a genus of beetles in the family Cerambycidae, containing the following species:

- Calliclytus schwarzi Fisher, 1932
- Calliclytus elegans Fisher, 1932
- Calliclytus macoris Lingafelter, 2011
- Calliclytus wappesi Miroshnikov, 2014
