= Tortyra rhodoclaena =

Scientific classification
- Kingdom: Animalia
- Phylum: Arthropoda
- Class: Insecta
- Order: Lepidoptera
- Family: Choreutidae
- Genus: Tortyra
- Species: T. rhodoclaena

Binomial name
- Tortyra rhodoclaena Meyrick, 1930

Species of moth

Tortyra rhodoclaena is a moth of the family Choreutidae. It is known from French Guiana.
