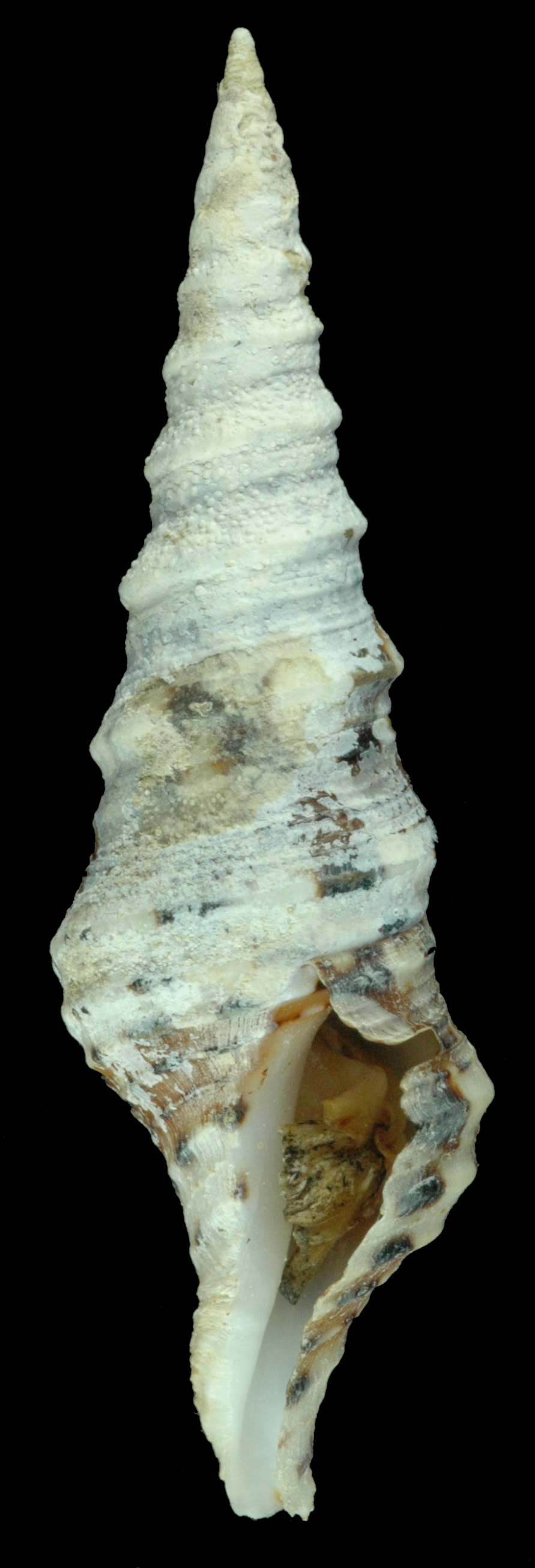

Scientific classification
- Kingdom: Animalia
- Phylum: Mollusca
- Class: Gastropoda
- Subclass: Caenogastropoda
- Order: Neogastropoda
- Family: Turridae
- Genus: Turris
- Species: T. spectabilis

Binomial name
- Turris spectabilis (Reeve, 1843)

Synonyms
- Pleurotoma spectabilis Reeve, 1843

= Turris spectabilis =

Species of gastropod

Turris spectabilis is a species of sea snail, a marine gastropod mollusk in the family Turridae, the turrids.

== Description ==
(Original description) The spotting is of a more numerous and miscellaneous character in this species than in any of the genus, though it presents in certain respects a modification of that in Turris garnonsii (Reeve, 1843). The dusky band which girds the lower portion of the whorls in that species is exhibited both round the lower and upper portions in this, and the number of spots is apparently doubled in like manner. The siphonal canal is short, and presents a great peculiarity of character.

== Distribution ==
This marine species occurs off the Philippines.
