= Epropetes velutina =

Scientific classification
- Kingdom: Animalia
- Phylum: Arthropoda
- Class: Insecta
- Order: Coleoptera
- Suborder: Polyphaga
- Infraorder: Cucujiformia
- Family: Cerambycidae
- Genus: Epropetes
- Species: E. velutina

Binomial name
- Epropetes velutina Martins, 1975

Species of beetle

Epropetes velutina is a species of beetle in the family Cerambycidae. It was described by Martins in 1975.
