= Calliclytus schwarzi =

Scientific classification
- Kingdom: Animalia
- Phylum: Arthropoda
- Clade: Pancrustacea
- Class: Insecta
- Order: Coleoptera
- Suborder: Polyphaga
- Infraorder: Cucujiformia
- Family: Cerambycidae
- Genus: Calliclytus
- Species: C. schwarzi

Binomial name
- Calliclytus schwarzi Fisher, 1932

Species of beetle

Calliclytus schwarzi is a species of beetle in the family Cerambycidae, the longhorn beetles. This beetle is found in Cuba.

== Taxonomy ==
Calliclytus schwarzi was first described by Warren Samuel Fisher in 1932, with its type location given as Cayamas, Cuba. It is the type species of the genus Calliclytus, which contains four total species.
