= Tetranodus copei =

Scientific classification
- Kingdom: Animalia
- Phylum: Arthropoda
- Class: Insecta
- Order: Coleoptera
- Suborder: Polyphaga
- Infraorder: Cucujiformia
- Family: Cerambycidae
- Genus: Tetranodus
- Species: T. copei

Binomial name
- Tetranodus copei Chemsak & Linsley, 1988

Species of beetle

Tetranodus copei is a species of beetle in the family Cerambycidae and tribe Tillomorphini. It was described by Chemsak and Linsley in 1988.
