= Tortyra fulgens =

Scientific classification
- Domain: Eukaryota
- Kingdom: Animalia
- Phylum: Arthropoda
- Class: Insecta
- Order: Lepidoptera
- Family: Choreutidae
- Genus: Tortyra
- Species: T. fulgens

Binomial name
- Tortyra fulgens (C. Felder, R. Felder & Rogenhofer, 1875)

Synonyms
- Choregia fulgens C. Felder, R. Felder & Rogenhofer, 1875

Species of moth

Tortyra fulgens is a moth of the family Choreutidae. It was described by Cajetan Felder, Rudolf Felder and Alois Friedrich Rogenhofer in 1875 and is known from Colombia, Brazil and Bolivia.

The larvae bore in young twigs of Ficus species.
