= Tortyra hoguella =

Scientific classification
- Kingdom: Animalia
- Phylum: Arthropoda
- Clade: Pancrustacea
- Class: Insecta
- Order: Lepidoptera
- Family: Choreutidae
- Genus: Tortyra
- Species: T. hoguella

Binomial name
- Tortyra hoguella Heppner, 1981

Species of moth

Tortyra hoguella is a moth of the family Choreutidae. It is known from Costa Rica, including Cocos Island from which it was described.

The length of the forewings is 5.2-6.5 mm. It has one of the most unusual wing patterns in the genus Tortyra due to the prominent white forewing fascia.
