= Tortyra cuprinella =

Scientific classification
- Domain: Eukaryota
- Kingdom: Animalia
- Phylum: Arthropoda
- Class: Insecta
- Order: Lepidoptera
- Family: Choreutidae
- Genus: Tortyra
- Species: T. cuprinella

Binomial name
- Tortyra cuprinella Busck, 1914

Species of moth

Tortyra cuprinella is a moth of the family Choreutidae. It is known from Panama and Costa Rica.
