= Tortyra vividis =

Scientific classification
- Kingdom: Animalia
- Phylum: Arthropoda
- Class: Insecta
- Order: Lepidoptera
- Family: Choreutidae
- Genus: Tortyra
- Species: T. vividis

Binomial name
- Tortyra vividis Busck, 1934

Species of moth

Tortyra vividis is a moth of the family Choreutidae. It is known from Cuba.
