= Lamproclytus oakleyi =

Scientific classification
- Kingdom: Animalia
- Phylum: Arthropoda
- Class: Insecta
- Order: Coleoptera
- Suborder: Polyphaga
- Infraorder: Cucujiformia
- Family: Cerambycidae
- Genus: Lamproclytus
- Species: L. oakleyi

Binomial name
- Lamproclytus oakleyi Fisher, 1935

Species of beetle

Lamproclytus oakleyi is a species of beetle in the family Cerambycidae. It was described by Fisher in 1935.
