= Tetranodus niveicollis =

Scientific classification
- Kingdom: Animalia
- Phylum: Arthropoda
- Class: Insecta
- Order: Coleoptera
- Suborder: Polyphaga
- Infraorder: Cucujiformia
- Family: Cerambycidae
- Genus: Tetranodus
- Species: T. niveicollis

Binomial name
- Tetranodus niveicollis Linell, 1897

Species of beetle

Tetranodus niveicollis is a species of beetle in the family Cerambycidae. It was described by Linell in 1897.
