= Lamproclytus =

Scientific classification
- Kingdom: Animalia
- Phylum: Arthropoda
- Class: Insecta
- Order: Coleoptera
- Suborder: Polyphaga
- Infraorder: Cucujiformia
- Family: Cerambycidae
- Tribe: Tillomorphini
- Genus: Lamproclytus

Genus of beetles

Lamproclytus is a genus of beetles in the family Cerambycidae, containing the following species:

- Lamproclytus elegans Fisher, 1932
- Lamproclytus oakleyi Fisher, 1935
