= Tortyra sporodelta =

Scientific classification
- Kingdom: Animalia
- Phylum: Arthropoda
- Class: Insecta
- Order: Lepidoptera
- Family: Choreutidae
- Genus: Tortyra
- Species: T. sporodelta

Binomial name
- Tortyra sporodelta Meyrick, 1922

Species of moth

Tortyra sporodelta is a moth of the family Choreutidae. It is known from Peru and Costa Rica.

The wingspan is 15–16 mm. The forewings are bright shining coppery-golden with a blackish spot on the base of the costa and a moderately, slightly curved fascia of groundcolour at two-fifths, edged on each side with black and then with a fascia of dark fuscous white-tipped scales, the anterior narrow, the posterior narrow dorsally but broadly expanded upwards, extending on the costa to near the apex but on the posterior portion wholly dark fuscous without white points.
