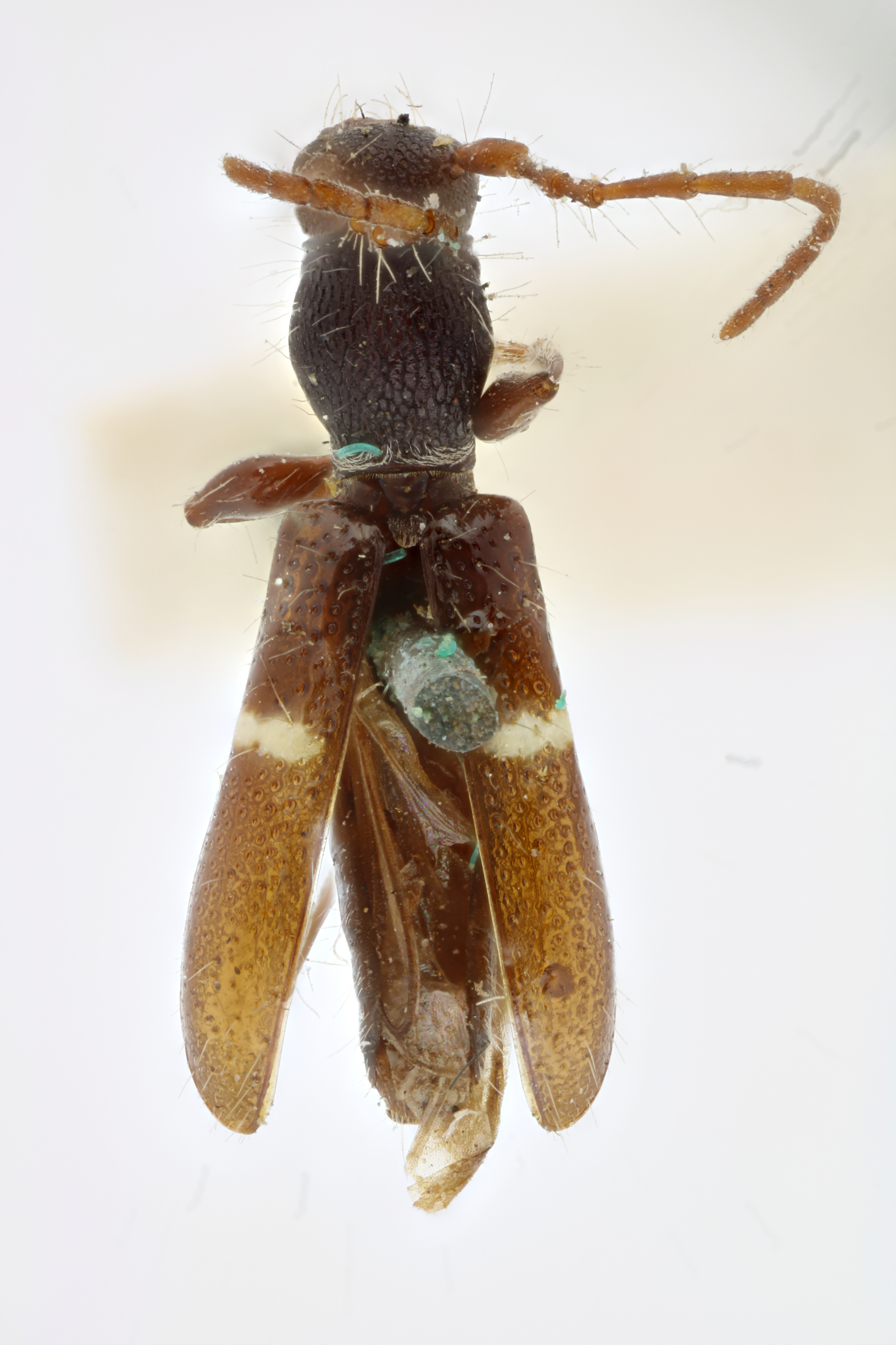
- T. reticeps

Scientific classification
- Kingdom: Animalia
- Phylum: Arthropoda
- Clade: Pancrustacea
- Class: Insecta
- Order: Coleoptera
- Suborder: Polyphaga
- Infraorder: Cucujiformia
- Family: Cerambycidae
- Subfamily: Cerambycinae
- Tribe: Tillomorphini
- Genus: Tetranodus; Linell, 1896

= Tetranodus =

Genus of beetles

Tetranodus is a genus of beetles in the family Cerambycidae, containing the following species:

- Tetranodus angulicollis Chemsak, 1969
- Tetranodus copei Chemsak & Linsley, 1988
- Tetranodus niveicollis Linell, 1897
- Tetranodus reticeps (Bates, 1880)
- Tetranodus rugipennis Chemsak, 1969
- Tetranodus tropipennis Chemsak, 1977
- Tetranodus xanthocollis Chemsak, 1977
