= Tortyra spectabilis =

Scientific classification
- Kingdom: Animalia
- Phylum: Arthropoda
- Class: Insecta
- Order: Lepidoptera
- Family: Choreutidae
- Genus: Tortyra
- Species: T. spectabilis

Binomial name
- Tortyra spectabilis Walker, 1863

Species of moth

Tortyra spectabilis is a moth of the family Choreutidae. It is known from Brazil and Costa Rica.
