= Arawakia =

Scientific classification
- Kingdom: Animalia
- Phylum: Arthropoda
- Class: Insecta
- Order: Coleoptera
- Suborder: Polyphaga
- Infraorder: Cucujiformia
- Family: Cerambycidae
- Genus: Arawakia
- Species: A. inopinata

Binomial name
- Arawakia inopinata Villiers, 1981

Species of beetles

Arawakia inopinata is a species of beetle in the family Cerambycidae, the only species in the genus Arawakia.
