= Epipodocarpus =

Scientific classification
- Kingdom: Animalia
- Phylum: Arthropoda
- Class: Insecta
- Order: Coleoptera
- Suborder: Polyphaga
- Infraorder: Cucujiformia
- Family: Cerambycidae
- Genus: Epipodocarpus
- Species: E. andinus

Binomial name
- Epipodocarpus andinus Bosq, 1951

Genus of beetles

Epipodocarpus andinus is a species of beetle in the family Cerambycidae, the only species in the genus Epipodocarpus.
