= Mygalobas =

Mygalobas corticina

Scientific classification
- Kingdom: Animalia
- Phylum: Arthropoda
- Class: Insecta
- Order: Coleoptera
- Suborder: Polyphaga
- Infraorder: Cucujiformia
- Family: Cerambycidae
- Genus: Mygalobas
- Species: M. corticina

Binomial name
- Mygalobas corticina (Chevrolat, 1862)

Genus of beetles

Mygalobas corticina is a species of beetle in the family Cerambycidae, the only species in the genus Mygalobas.
