= Licracantha =

Licracantha formicaria

Scientific classification
- Kingdom: Animalia
- Phylum: Arthropoda
- Class: Insecta
- Order: Coleoptera
- Suborder: Polyphaga
- Infraorder: Cucujiformia
- Family: Cerambycidae
- Genus: Licracantha
- Species: L. formicaria

Binomial name
- Licracantha formicaria Lingafelter, 2011

Genus of beetles

Licracantha formicaria is a species of beetle in the family Cerambycidae, the only species in the genus Licracantha.
