= Tilloglomus =

Scientific classification
- Domain: Eukaryota
- Kingdom: Animalia
- Phylum: Arthropoda
- Class: Insecta
- Order: Coleoptera
- Suborder: Polyphaga
- Infraorder: Cucujiformia
- Family: Cerambycidae
- Tribe: Tillomorphini
- Genus: Tilloglomus; Martins, 1975
- Species: T. spectabile

Binomial name
- Tilloglomus spectabile Martins, 1975

Genus of beetles

Tilloglomus is a genus of longhorn beetles in the family Cerambycidae. This genus has a single species, Tilloglomus spectabile, found in Brazil.
