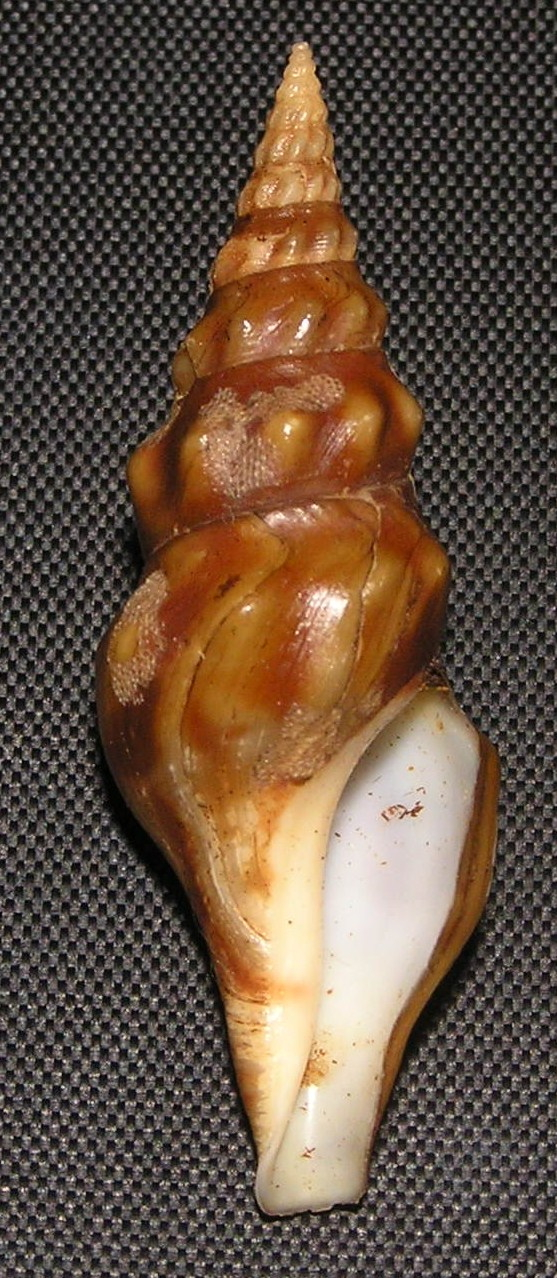
- Shell of Tiariturris spectabilis

Scientific classification
- Kingdom: Animalia
- Phylum: Mollusca
- Class: Gastropoda
- Subclass: Caenogastropoda
- Order: Neogastropoda
- Superfamily: Conoidea
- Family: Pseudomelatomidae
- Genus: Tiariturris
- Species: T. spectabilis

Binomial name
- Tiariturris spectabilis Berry, 1958

= Tiariturris spectabilis =

Species of gastropod

Tiariturris spectabilis is a species of small sea snail, a marine gastropod mollusk in the family Pseudomelatomidae.

== Description ==
The length of the shell varies between 55 mm and 75 mm.

== Distribution ==
This marine species occurs from the Sea of Cortez fromWestern Mexico to Colombia.
