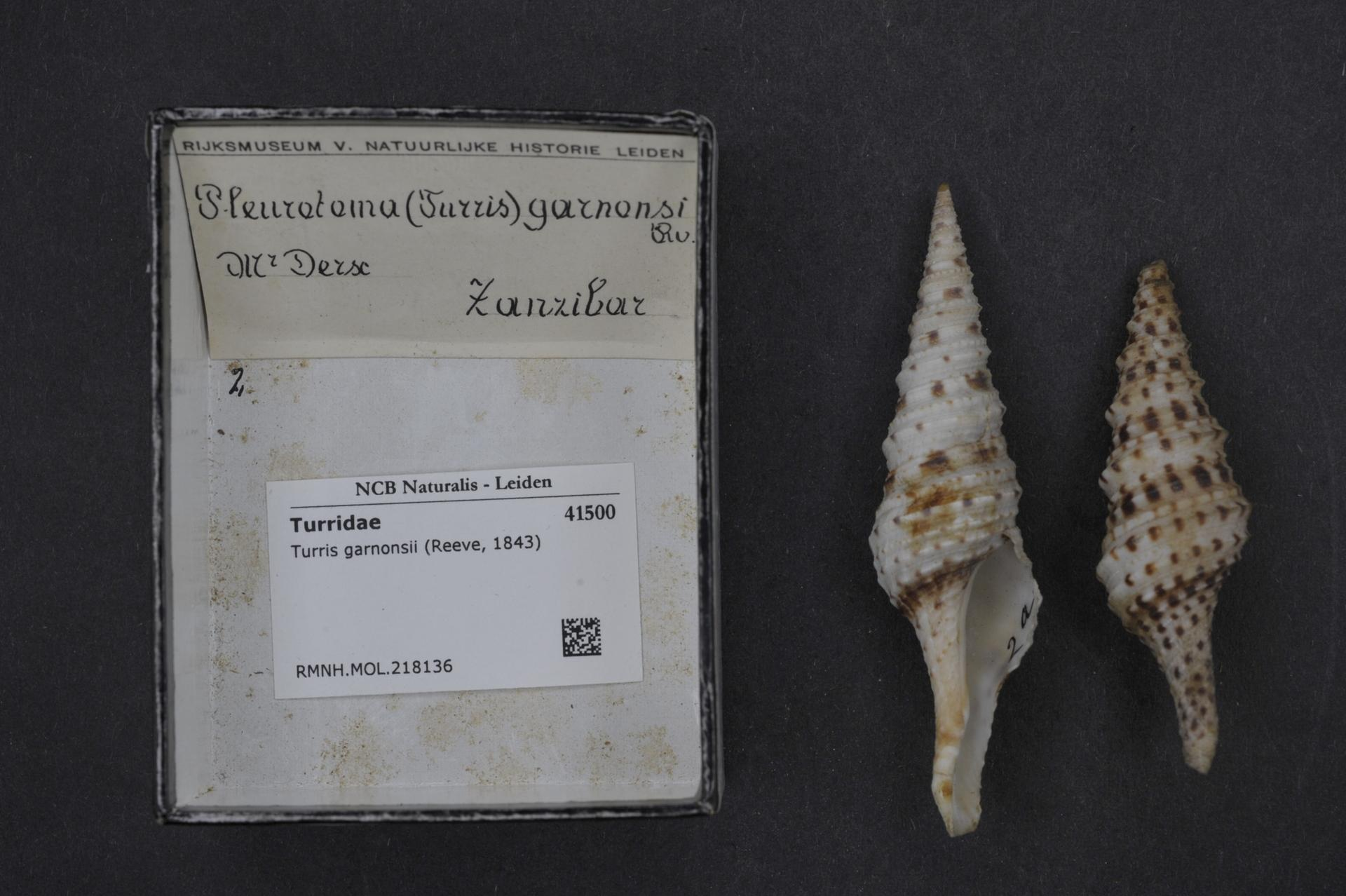
- Shell of Turris garnonsii (specimen at Naturalis Biodiversity Center)

Scientific classification
- Kingdom: Animalia
- Phylum: Mollusca
- Class: Gastropoda
- Subclass: Caenogastropoda
- Order: Neogastropoda
- Superfamily: Conoidea
- Family: Turridae
- Genus: Turris
- Species: T. garnonsii

Binomial name
- Turris garnonsii (Reeve, 1843)

Synonyms
- Pleurotoma garnonsii Reeve, 1843

= Turris garnonsii =

Species of gastropod

Turris garnonsii, common name Garnons' pleurotoma, is a species of sea snail, a marine gastropod mollusk in the family Turridae, the turrids.

== Description ==
The length of the shell varies between 49 mm and 109 mm.

(Original description) The shell is elongately turreted, slender, fusiform, whitish, transversely keeled. A prominent peripheral keel renders the whorls angular.The keels are vividly painted with small reddish brown spots. The whorls are convex, ornamented round the upper part with a row of large square brown spots or patches. The body whorl shows a brown band round the lower part, it being concealed in the rest by the natural deposit of one whorl upon the other. The siphonal canal is more or less elongated.

The shell is narrower than Turris babylonia, with narrower and sharper revolving ribs. Above the sinus these are mostly replaced by several revolving raised lines. The shell is whitish or yellowish white, with small brown spots on the principal ribs, larger oblique brown patches below the sutures, and on the body whorl near the top of the siphonal canal the latter are frequently confluent into a broad, more or less interrupted band.

== Distribution ==
This marine species occurs in the Indo-West Pacific: Tanzania, Mauritius, Mozambique, the Philippines, Fiji Islands.
