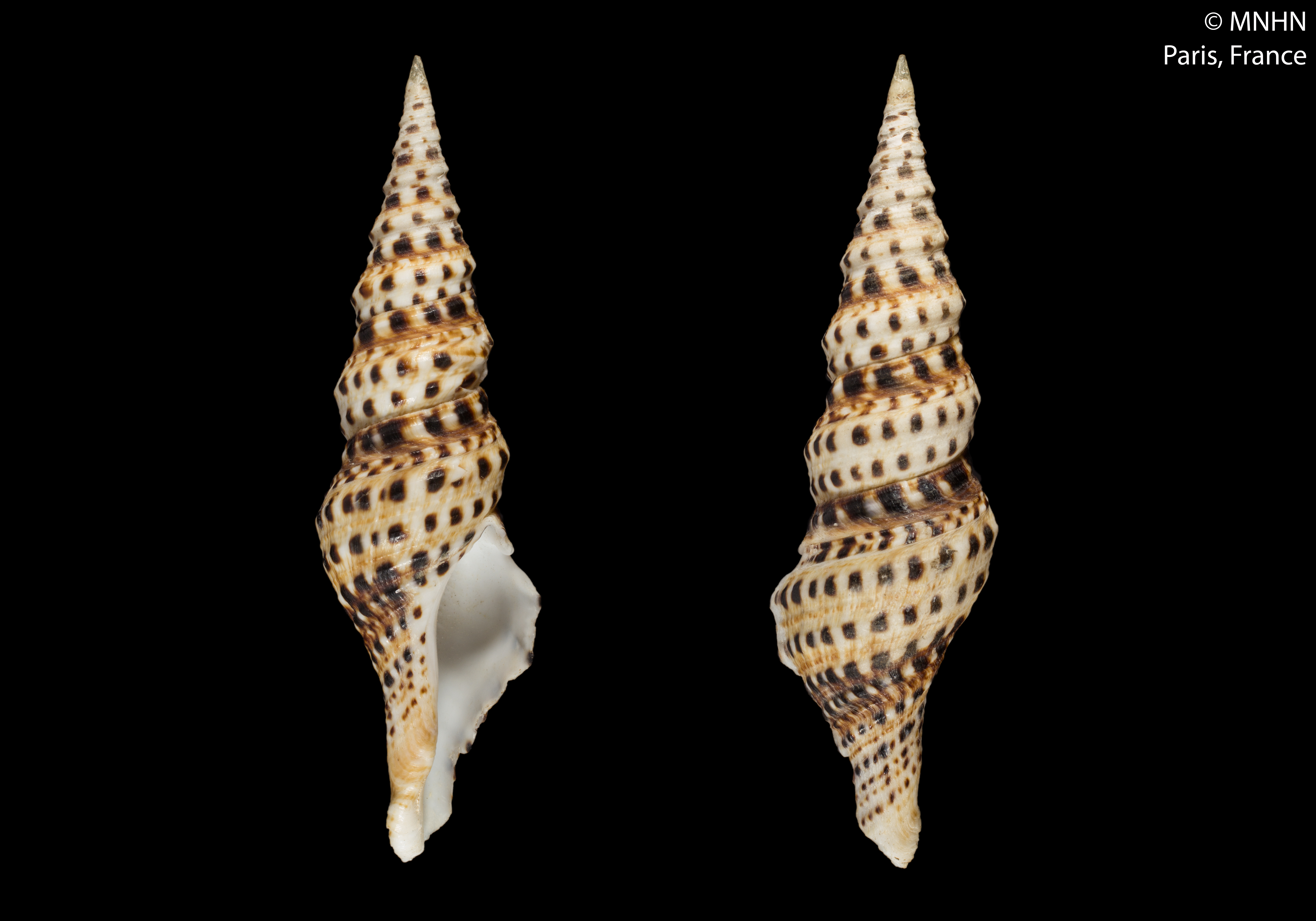
- Shell of Turris chaldaea (holotype at MNHN, Paris)

Scientific classification
- Kingdom: Animalia
- Phylum: Mollusca
- Class: Gastropoda
- Subclass: Caenogastropoda
- Order: Neogastropoda
- Family: Turridae
- Genus: Turris
- Species: T. chaldaea

Binomial name
- Turris chaldaea Kilburn, Fedosov & B. M. Olivera, 2012

= Turris chaldaea =

Species of gastropod

Turris chaldaea is a species of sea snail, a marine gastropod mollusk in the family Turridae, the turrids.

== Description ==
The shell can get to be 95.5 millimetres (3.76 in) long.

== Distribution ==
This marine species occurs in the Philippine Sea, including off the Philippines, Japan, and the Solomon Islands.
