= Turrid =

Common name for many species of snail

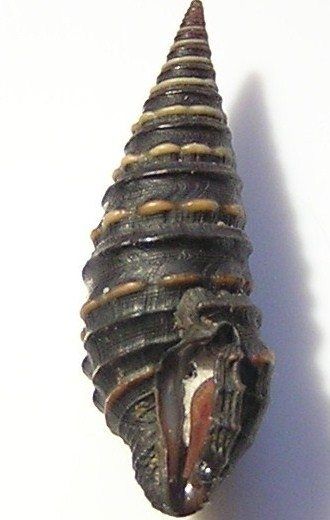
A shell of Zonulispira chrysochildosa

Turrid, plural turrids, is a common name for a very large group of predatory sea snails, marine gastropod mollusks which until recently were all classified in the family Turridae. However, recently the family was discovered to be polyphyletic and therefore was split into a number of families.

The original family Turridae used to contain more than 4,000 species. the Turridae (sensu Powell 1966) It was the largest mollusk family and the largest group of marine caenogastropods. There were approximately 27,000 described scientific names (accepted names plus synonyms) within the family Turridae. Turrids constituted more than half of the predatory species of gastropods in some parts of the world (Taylor et al. 1980). However, this very large family was shown to be polyphyletic, and in 2011 it was divided into 13 separate families by Bouchet, Kantor, Sysoev and Puilandre.

The single most complete collection of turrids in museums worldwide is in the Academy of Natural Sciences of Philadelphia malacology collection; this is because of specialized collecting by the American malacologist Virginia Orr Maes (1920-1986).

== Distribution ==
Turrids are found worldwide in every sea and ocean from both poles to the tropics. They occur from the low-intertidal zone to depths of more than eight thousand metres (e.g., Xanthodaphne levis Sysoev, 1988, collected between 7974–8006 m, in the Bougainville Trench). However, most species of turrids are found in the neritic zone.

== Shell description ==
Most turrids are rather small, with a height under 2 cm, but the adult shells of different species are between 0.3 and 11.4 cm in height.

The shape of the shells is more or less fusiform, varying from very high-spired to broadly ovate. The whorls are elongate to broadly conical.

The sculpture is very variable in form, but most have axial sculpture or spiral sculpture (or a combination of both). Others may be reticulate, beaded, nodulose, or striate.

The aperture of the shell very often has a V-shaped sinus or notch, an indentation on the upper end of the outer lip. This accommodates the anal siphonal notch, commonly known as the "turrid notch". The siphonal canal is usually open, varying from short and stocky to long and slender. The position of the turrid notch of the shell and the form and sculpture of the whorls have traditionally been the primary methods of classifying the turrids.

The columella is usually smooth and only seldom shows labial plicae. The operculum is horny, but is not always present.

Turrids are carnivorous, predatory gastropods. Most species have a poison gland used with the toxoglossan radula, used to prey on vertebrates and invertebrate animals (mostly polychaete worms) or in self-defense. Some turrids have lost the radula and the poison gland. The radula, when present, has two or three teeth in a row. It lacks lateral teeth and the marginal teeth are of the wishbone or duplex type. The teeth with a duplex form are not shaped from two distinct elements but grow from a flat plate, by thickening at the edges of the teeth and elevation of the rear edge from the membrane.

Female turrids lay their eggs in lens-shaped capsules.

== History of the taxonomy ==
The turrids were perceived as one of the most difficult groups to study because of a large number of supra-specific described taxa, which are complicated by their species diversity. Although some species of turrids are relatively common, many are rare, some being known only from single specimens; this is another factor that makes studying the group difficult.

2011 taxonomy

The previous (2005) classification system for the group was thoroughly changed by the publication in 2011 of the article Bouchet P., Kantor Yu.I., Sysoev A. & Puillandre N. (2011) A new operational classification of the Conoidea. Journal of Molluscan Studies 77: 273-308. The authors presented a new classification of the Conoidea on the genus level, based on anatomical characters but also on the molecular phylogeny as presented by Puillandre N., et al., 2008. The polyphyletic family Turridae was resolved into 13 monophyletic families (containing 358 currently recognized genera and subgenera) :

- Conorbidae
- Borsoniidae
- Clathurellidae
- Mitromorphidae
- Mangeliidae
- Raphitomidae
- Cochlespiridae
- Drilliidae
- Pseudomelatomidae (= Crassispiridae)
- Clavatulidae
- Horaiclavidae
- Turridae s.s.
- Strictispiridae

2005 taxonomy

According to the taxonomy of the Gastropoda by Bouchet & Rocroi, 2005, which attempted to set out a stable taxonomy, this group consisted of the following five subfamilies:

- Turrinae H. Adams & A. Adams, 1853 (1838) - synonyms: Pleurotominae Gray, 1838; Lophiotominae Morrison, 1965 (n.a.)
- Cochlespirinae Powell, 1942
- Crassispirinae McLean, 1971 - synonym: Belinae A. Bellardi, 1875
- Zemaciinae Sysoev, 2003
- Zonulispirinae McLean, 1971

== Genera ==
Genera in the family Turridae used to include:

- Abyssocomitas Sysoev & Kantor, 1986
- Acamptogenotia Rovereto, 1899
- Aforia Dall, 1889
- Anacithara Hedley, 1922
- Ancistrosyrinx Dall, 1881
- Anticomitas Powell, 1942
- Antiguraleus Powell, 1942
- Antimelatoma Powell, 1942
- Antiplanes Dall, 1902
- Aoteadrillia Powell, 1942
- Apiotoma Cossmann, 1889
- Asperdaphne Hedley, 1922
- Austrodrillia Hedley, 1918
- Bathybela Kobelt, 1905
- Belalora Powell, 1951
- Benthoclionella Kilburn, 1974
- Buchema Corea, 1934
- Burchia Bartsch, 1944
- Calcatodrillia Kilburn, 1988
- Carinapex Dall, 1924
- Carinodrillia Dall, 1919
- Carinoturris Bartsch, 1944
- Ceritoturris Dall, 1924
- Cheungbeia Taylor & Wells, 1994
- Clavatula Lamarck, 1801
- Clavosurcula Schepman, 1913
- Clavus Montfort, 1810
- Clionella Gray, 1847
- Cochlespira Conrad, 1865
- Compsodrillia Woodring, 1928
- Conorbela Powell, 1951
- Conticosta Laseron, 1954
- Crassiclava McLean, 1971
- Crassispira Swainson, 1840
- Cretaspira Kuroda & Oyama, 1971
- Cryptogemma Dall, 1918
- Cymakra Gardner, 1937
- Danilacarina Bozzetti, 1997
- Daphnella Hinds, 1844
- Darrylia Garcia, 2008
- Decollidrillia Habe & Ito, 1965
- Doxospira McLean, 1971
- Eosurcula Casey, 1904
- Epideira Hedley, 1918
- Epidirona Iredale, 1931
- Fenimorea Bartsch, 1934
- Fusiturricula Woodring, 1928
- Fusiturris Thiele, 1929
- Gemmula Weinkauff, 1875
- Graciliclava Shuto, 1983
- Haedropleura Monterosato in Bucquoy, Dautzenberg & Dollfus, 1883
- Hauturua Powell, 1942
- Hemilienardia Boettger, 1895
- Heterocithara Hedley, 1922
- Hindsiclava Hertlein and Strong, 1955
- Horaiclavus Oyama, 1954
- Inodrillia Bartsch, 1943
- Inquisitor Hedley, 1918
- Iotyrris Medinskaya & Sysoev, 2001
- Iredalea Oliver, 1915
- Irenosyrinx Dall, 1908
- Iwaoa Kuroda, 1953
- Knefastia Dall, 1919
- Kurilohadalia Sysoev & Kantor, 1986
- Kurodadrillia Azuma, 1975
- Kuroshioturris Shuto, 1961
- Leucosyrinx Dall, 1889 :p
- Lienardia Jousseaume 1884
- Lioglyphostoma Woodring, 1928
- Lophiotoma Casey, 1904
- Lophioturris Powell, 1964
- Liracraea Odhner, 1924
- Lora Gistl, 1848
- Lucerapex Iredale, 1936
- Lusitanops F. Nordsieck, 1968
- Maesiella McLean, 1971
- Makiyamaia Kuroda, 1961
- Marshallena Finlay, 1926
- Mauidrillia Powell, 1942
- Megasurcula Casey, 1904
- Microdrillia Casey, 1903
- Micropleurotoma Thiele, 1929
- Miraclathurella Woodring, 1928
- Monilispira Bartsch & Rehder, 1939
- Naskia Sysoev & Ivanov, 1985
- Neodrillia Bartsch, 1943
- Neoguraleus Powell, 1939
- Neopleurotomoides Shuto, 1925
- Nihonia McNeil, 1961
- Nodotoma Bartsch, 1941
- Nquma Kilburn, 1988
- Oenopota Moerch, 1852
- Paradrillia Makiyama, 1940
- Perrona Schumacher, 1817
- Philbertia Monterosato, 1884
- Phymorhynchus Dall, 1908
- Pilsbryspira Bartsch, 1950
- Pinguigemmula McNeil, 1961
- Plicisyrinx Sysoev & Kantor, 1986
- Polystira Woodring, 1928
- Pseudexomilus Powell, 1944
- Pseudotaranis McLean, 1995
- Psittacodrillia Kilburn, 1988
- Ptychobela Thiele, 1925
- Ptychosyrinx Thiele, 1925
- Pusionella Gray, 1847
- Pyrgospira McLean, 1971
- Rectiplanes Bartsch, 1944
- Rhodopetoma Bartsch, 1944
- Riuguhdrillia Oyama, 1951
- Scaevatula Gofas, 1990
- Shutonia van der Bijl, 1993
- Sinistrella Meyer, 1887
- Spirotropis Sars, 1878
- Splendrillia Dell, 1956
- Steiraxis Dall, 1896
- Stenodrillia Korobkov, 1955
- Striatoguraleus Kilburn, 1994
- Surcula H. Adams & A. Adams, 1853
- Teretia Norman, 1888
- Tomella Swainson, 1840
- Toxiclionella Powell, 1966
- Turricula Schumacher, 1817
- Turridrupa Hedley, 1922
- Turris Röding, 1798 - type genus
- Unedogemmula MacNeil, 1961
- Veprecula Melvill, 1917
- Vexitomina Powell, 1942
- Viridoturris Powell, 1964
- Viridrillia Bartsch, 1943
- Vitricythara Fargo, 1953
- Zemacies Finlay, 1926
- Zonulispira Bartsch, 1950
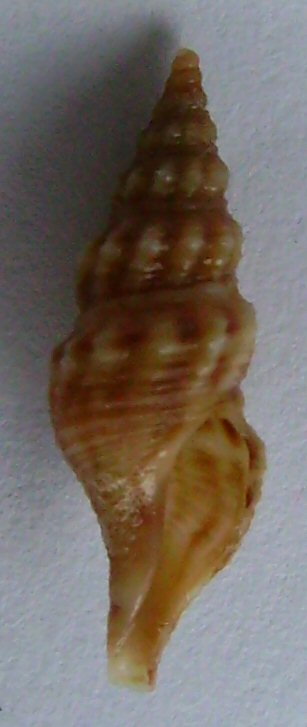
Antimelatoma buchanani

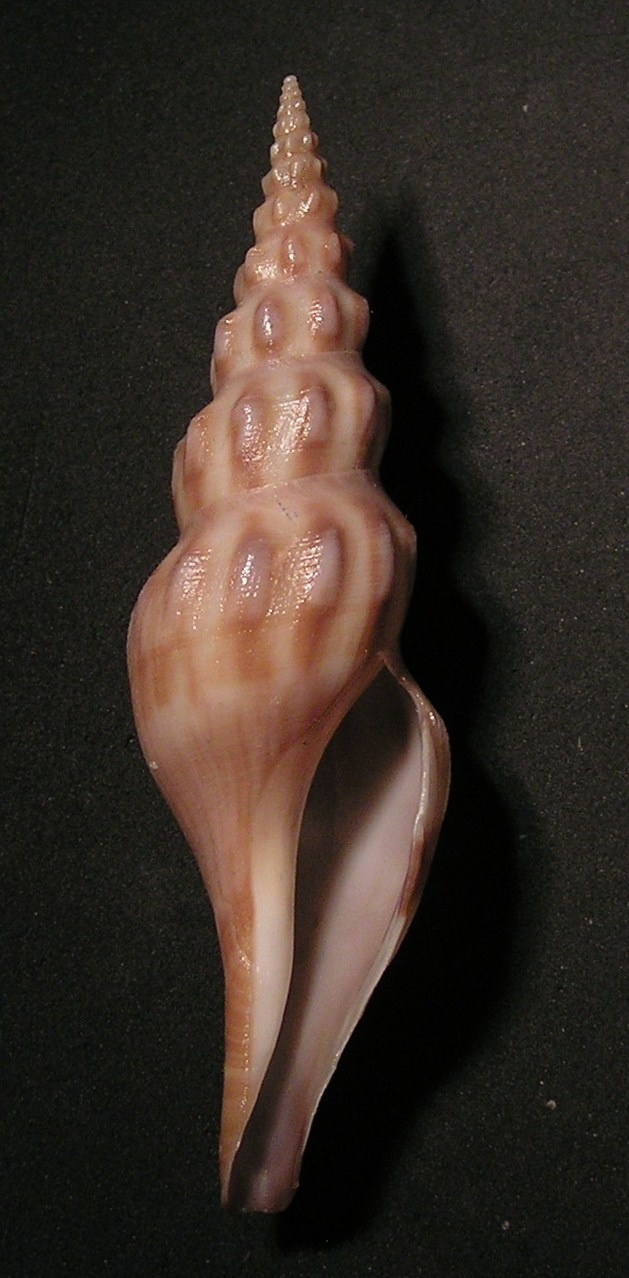
Comitas peelae

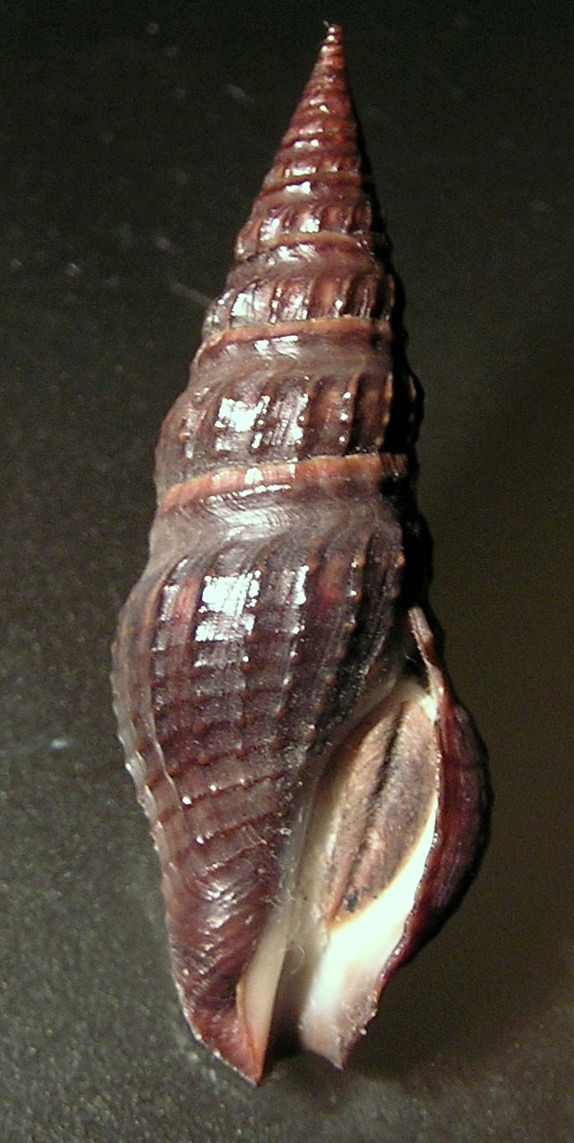
Crassispira incrassata

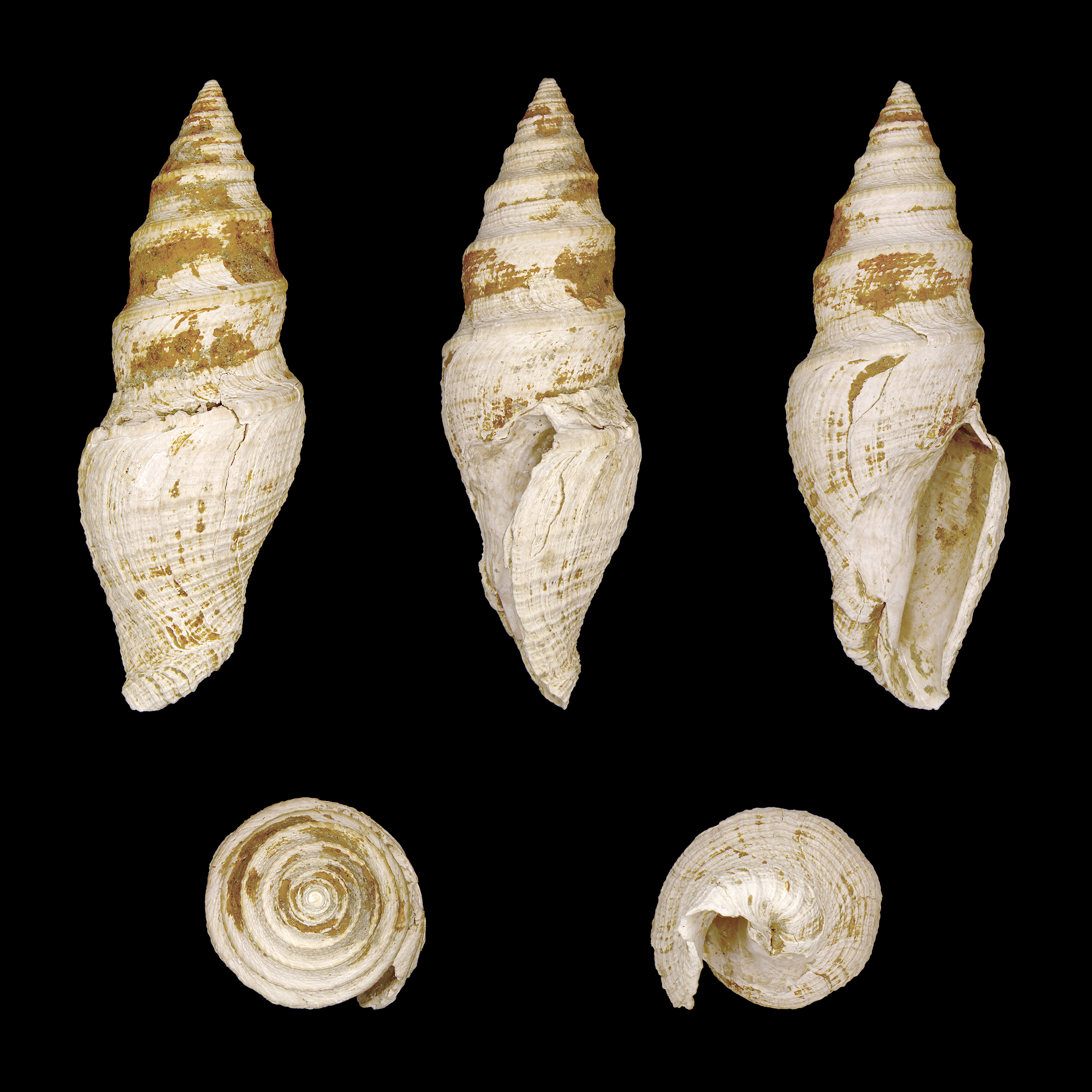
Epalxis cataphracta

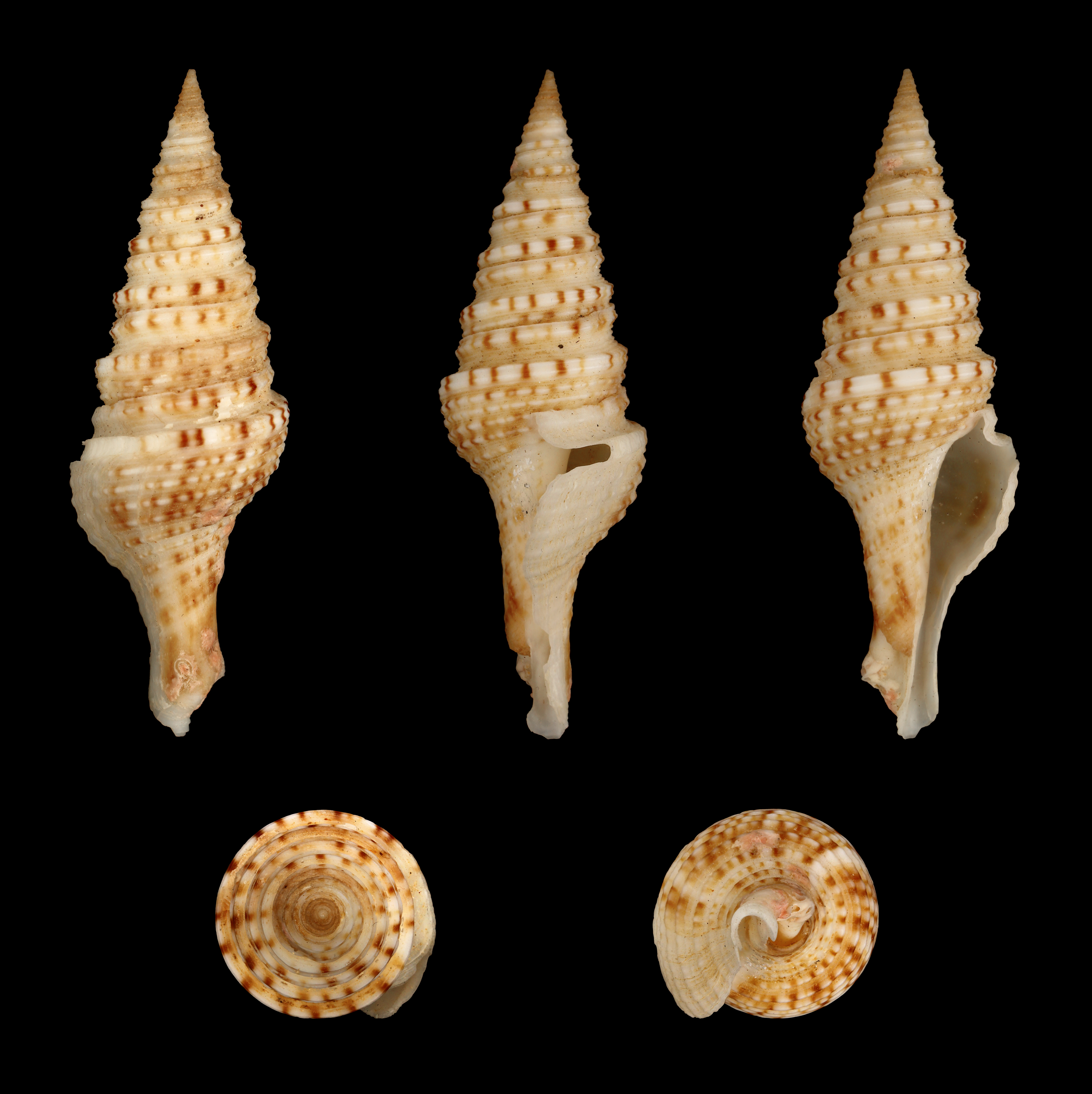
Gemmula unedo

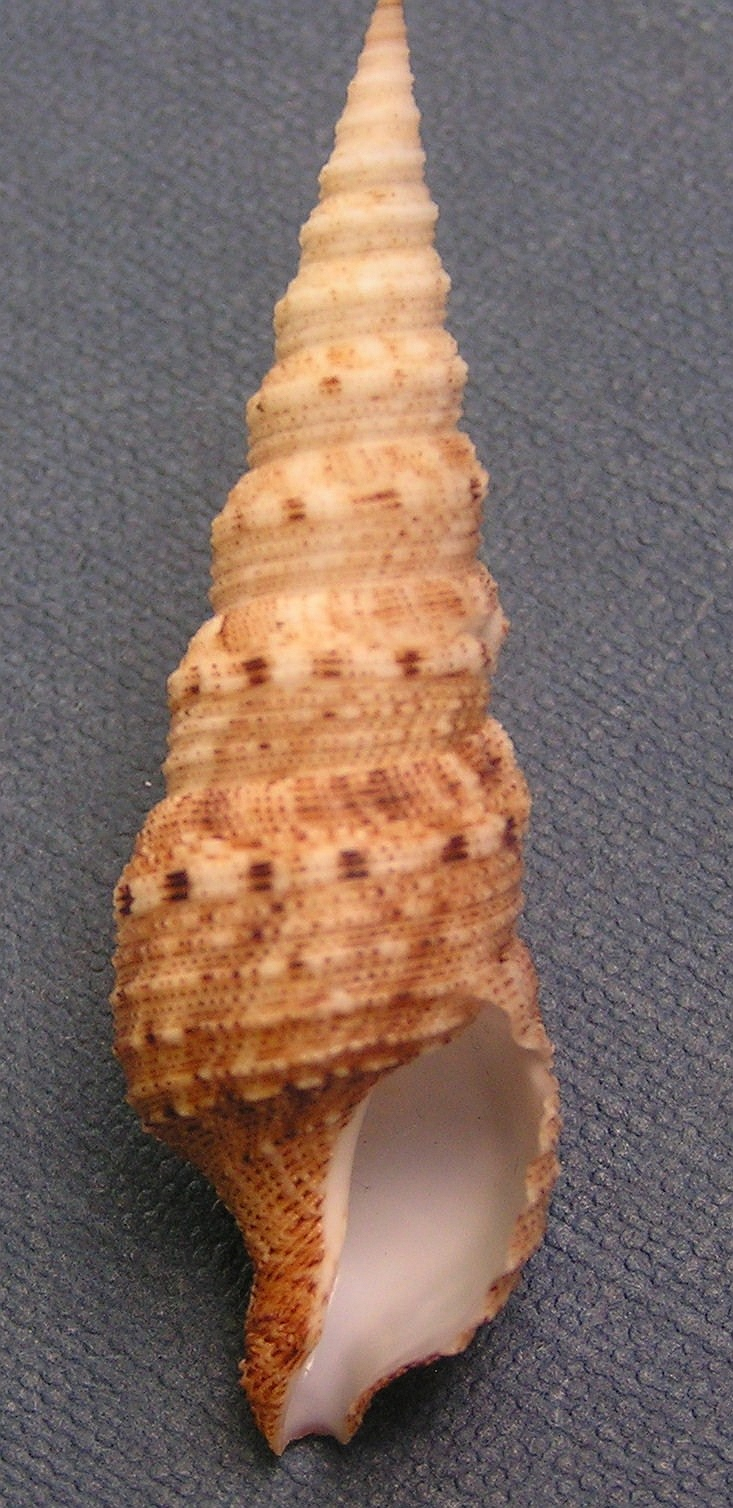
Iotyrris cingulifera

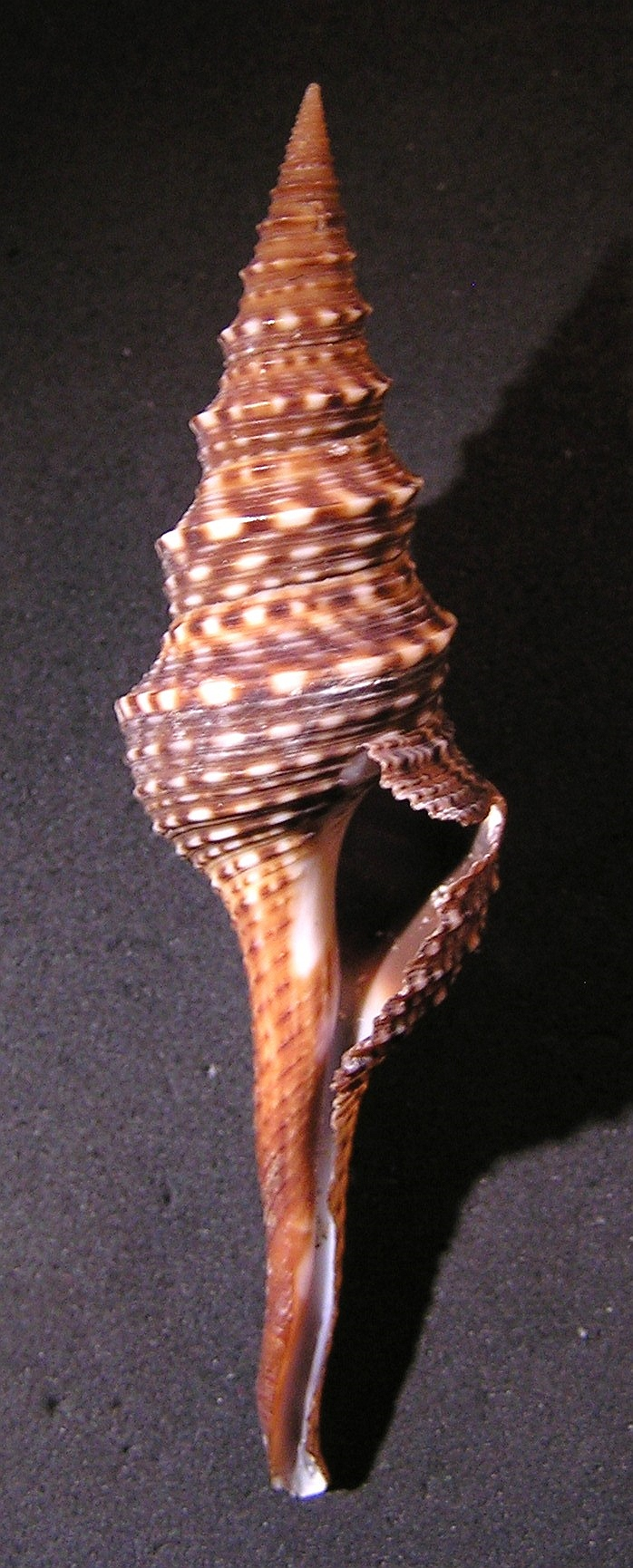
Lophiotoma indica

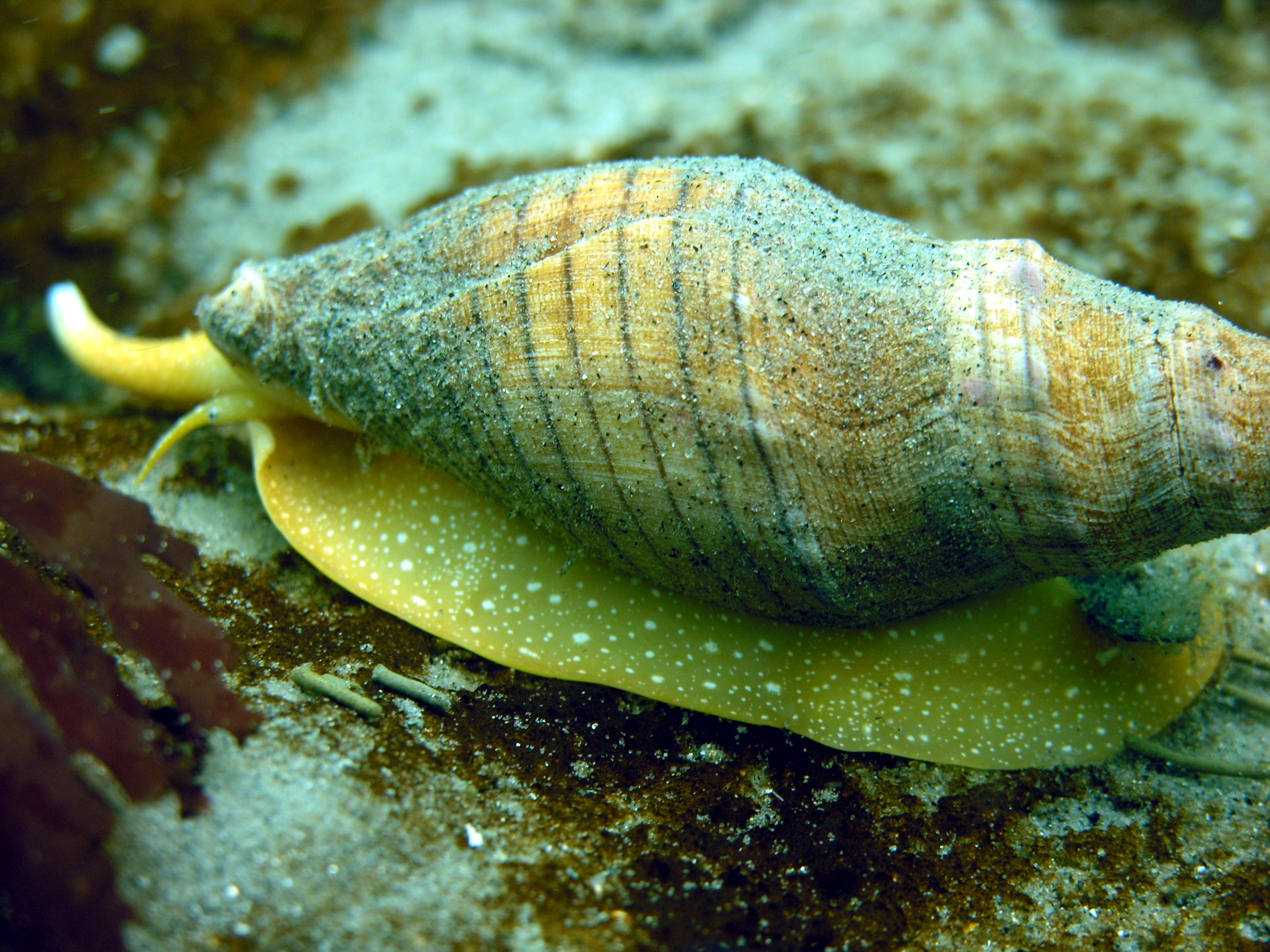
Megasurcula carpenteriana

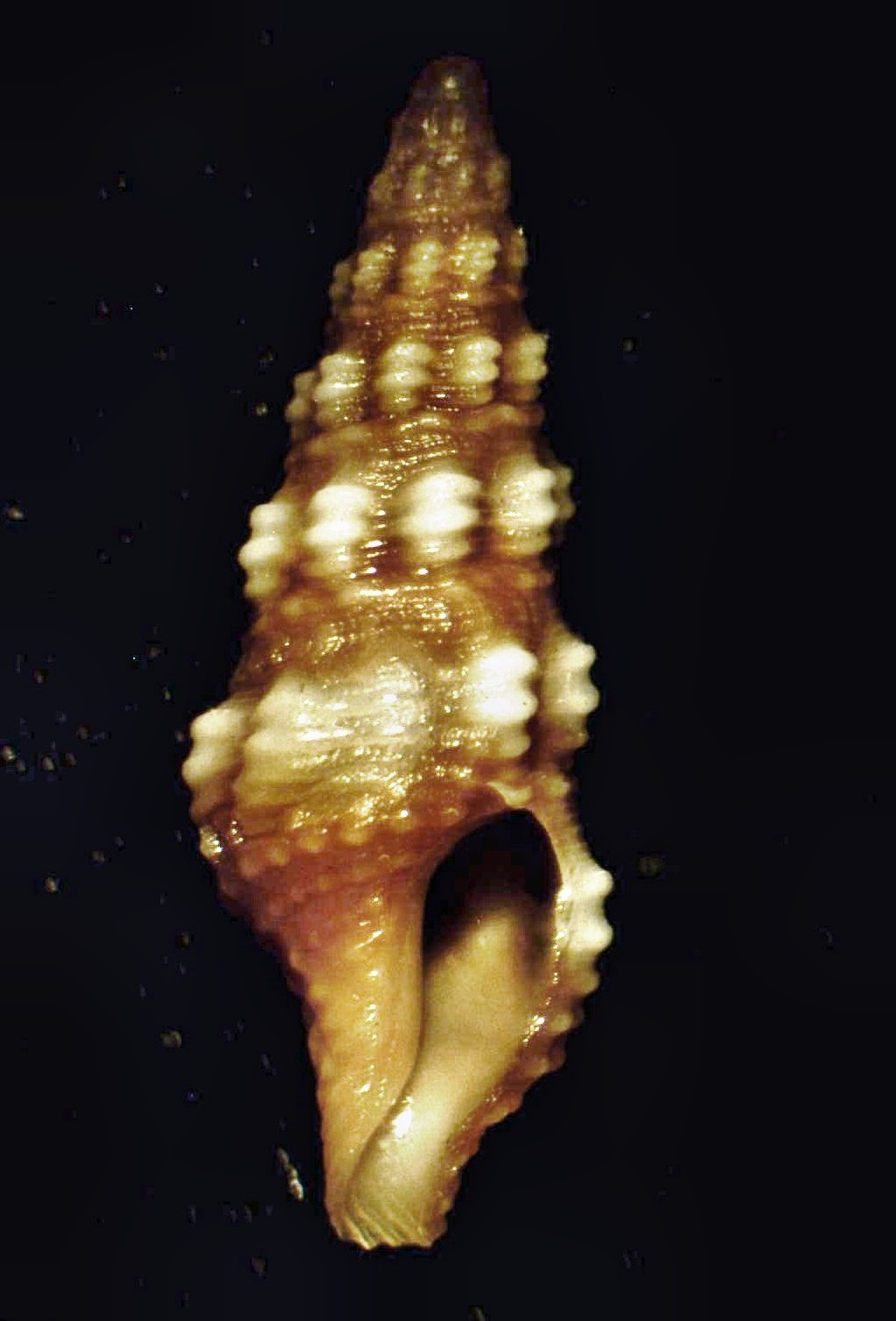
Pilsbryspira leucocyma

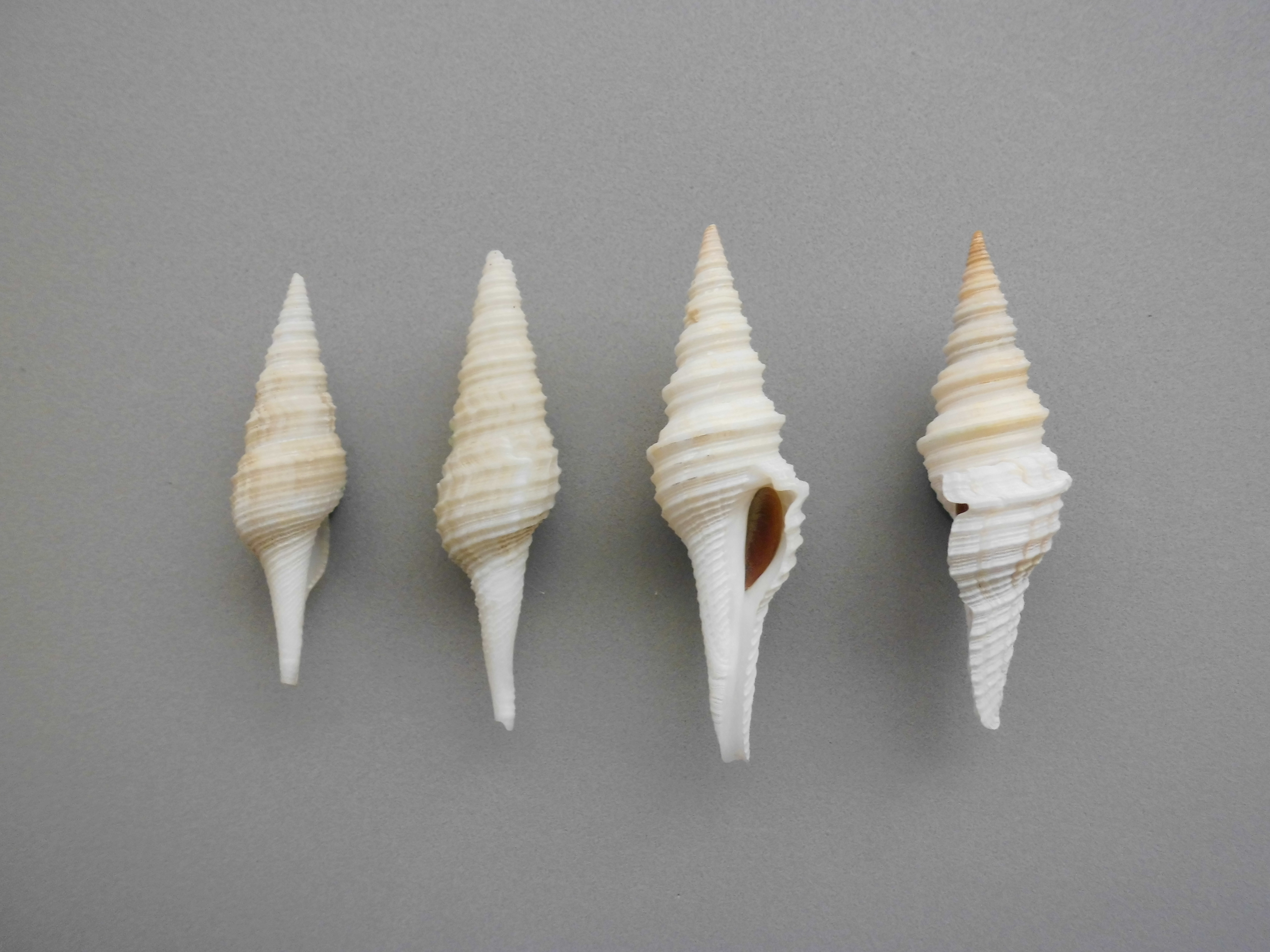
Polystira albida

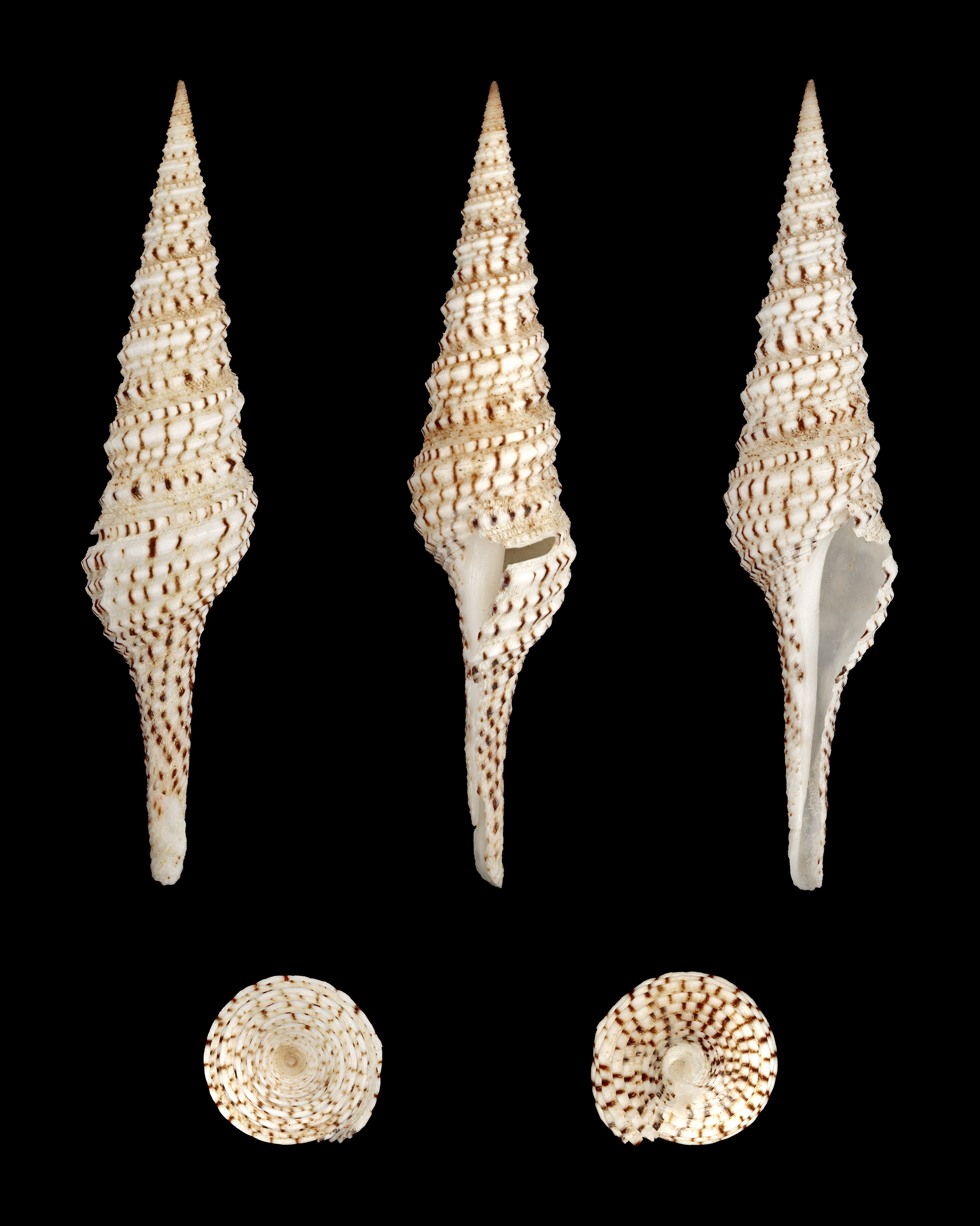
Turris crispa

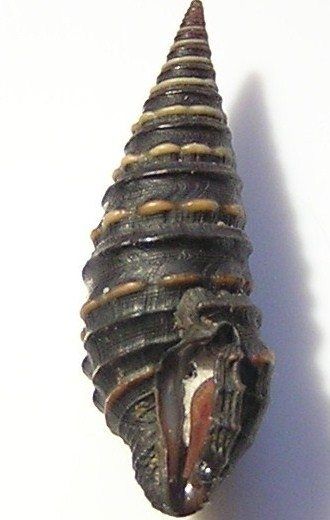
Zonulispira chrysochildosa
