= Purpuraturris cristata =

Scientific classification
- Kingdom: Animalia
- Phylum: Mollusca
- Class: Gastropoda
- Subclass: Caenogastropoda
- Order: Neogastropoda
- Superfamily: Conoidea
- Family: Turridae
- Genus: Purpuraturris
- Species: P. cristata

Binomial name
- Purpuraturris cristata (Vera-Peláez, Vega-Luz & Lozano-Francisco, 2000)

Synonyms
- Turris cristata Vera-Peláez, Vega-Luz & Lozano-Francisco, 2000

Species of gastropod

Purpuraturris cristata is a species of sea snail, a marine gastropod mollusk in the family Turridae, the turrids.

== Distribution ==
This marine species occurs in the Indo-West Pacific; also off the Philippines and Western Australia.
