= Crassispira mekranica =

Scientific classification
- Kingdom: Animalia
- Phylum: Mollusca
- Class: Gastropoda
- Subclass: Caenogastropoda
- Order: Neogastropoda
- Superfamily: Conoidea
- Family: Pseudomelatomidae
- Genus: Crassispira
- Species: C. mekranica

Binomial name
- Crassispira mekranica (Vredenburg 1925)

Synonyms
- † Drillia (Crassispira) mekranica Vredenburg 1925

Extinct species of gastropod

Crassispira mekranica is an extinct species of sea snail, a marine gastropod mollusk in the family Pseudomelatomidae, the turrids and allies.

== Description ==
The length of the shell attains 21 mm, its diameter 5.5 mm.

== Distribution ==
Fossils have been found in Tertiary strata of Northwest India.
