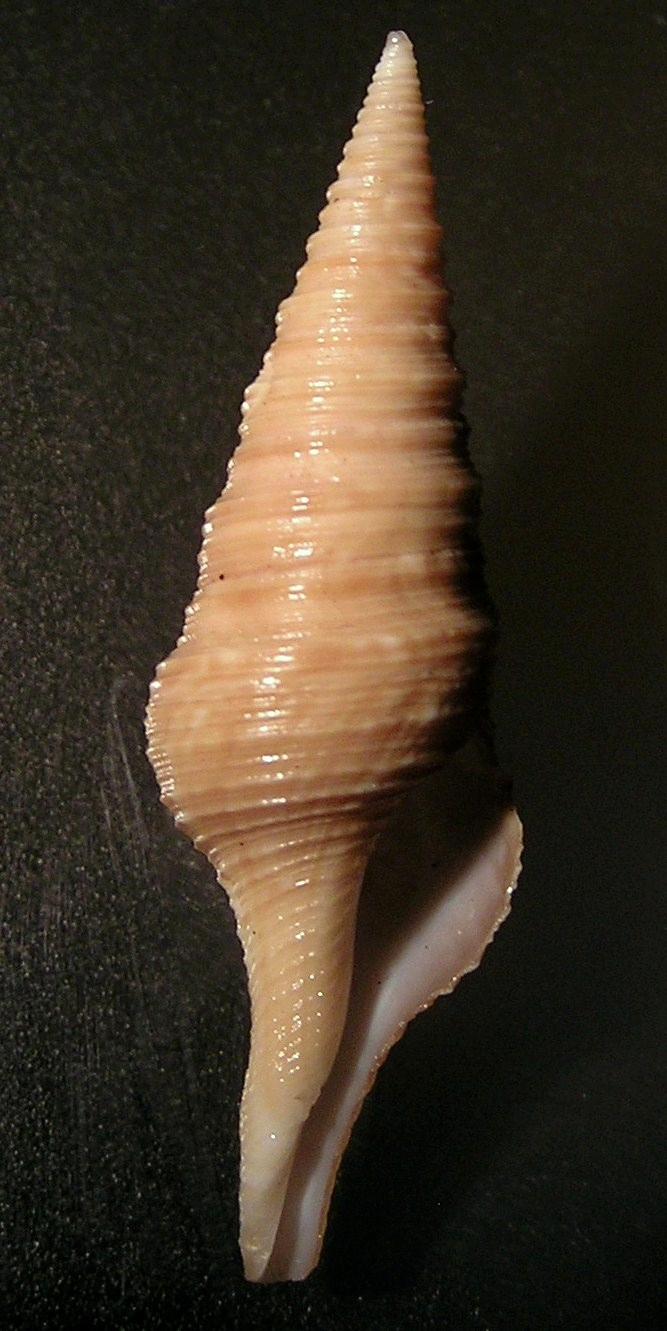

Scientific classification
- Kingdom: Animalia
- Phylum: Mollusca
- Class: Gastropoda
- Subclass: Caenogastropoda
- Order: Neogastropoda
- Superfamily: Conoidea
- Family: Turridae
- Genus: Purpuraturris
- Species: P. normandavidsoni

Binomial name
- Purpuraturris normandavidsoni (Vera-Peláez, Vega-Luz & Lozano-Francisco, 2000)

Synonyms
- Turris omnipurpurata Vera-Peláez, Vega-Luz & Lozano-Francisco, 2000

= Purpuraturris omnipurpurata =

Species of gastropod

Purpuraturris omnipurpurata is a species of sea snail, a marine gastropod mollusk in the family Turridae, the turrids.
