= Unedogemmula boreoturricula =

Scientific classification
- Kingdom: Animalia
- Phylum: Mollusca
- Class: Gastropoda
- Subclass: Caenogastropoda
- Order: Neogastropoda
- Superfamily: Conoidea
- Family: Turridae
- Genus: Unedogemmula
- Species: †U. boreoturricula

Binomial name
- †Unedogemmula boreoturricula (F. Kautsky, 1925)

Synonyms
- † Gemmula boreoturricula (F. Kautsky, 1925); † Turris (Gemmula) boreoturricula F. Kautsky, 1925

Species of gastropod

Unedogemmula boreoturricula is an extinct species of sea snail, a marine gastropod mollusk in the family Turridae, the turrids.

== Description ==
The length of the shell attains 28 mm.

== Distribution ==
This extinct marine species was found in Miocene strata in Belgium and the Netherlands.
