= Unedogemmula hanseata =

Scientific classification
- Kingdom: Animalia
- Phylum: Mollusca
- Class: Gastropoda
- Subclass: Caenogastropoda
- Order: Neogastropoda
- Superfamily: Conoidea
- Family: Turridae
- Genus: Unedogemmula
- Species: U. hanseata

Binomial name
- Unedogemmula hanseata (F. Kautsky, 1925)

Synonyms
- † Gemmula hanseata (F. Kautsky, 1925); † Turris (Gemmula) hanseata F. Kautsky, 1925

Species of gastropod

Unedogemmula hanseata is an extinct species of sea snail, a marine gastropod mollusk in the family Turridae, the turrids.

== Description ==
The length of the shell attains 23 mm.

== Distribution ==
This extinct marine species was found in Miocene strata in Belgium.
