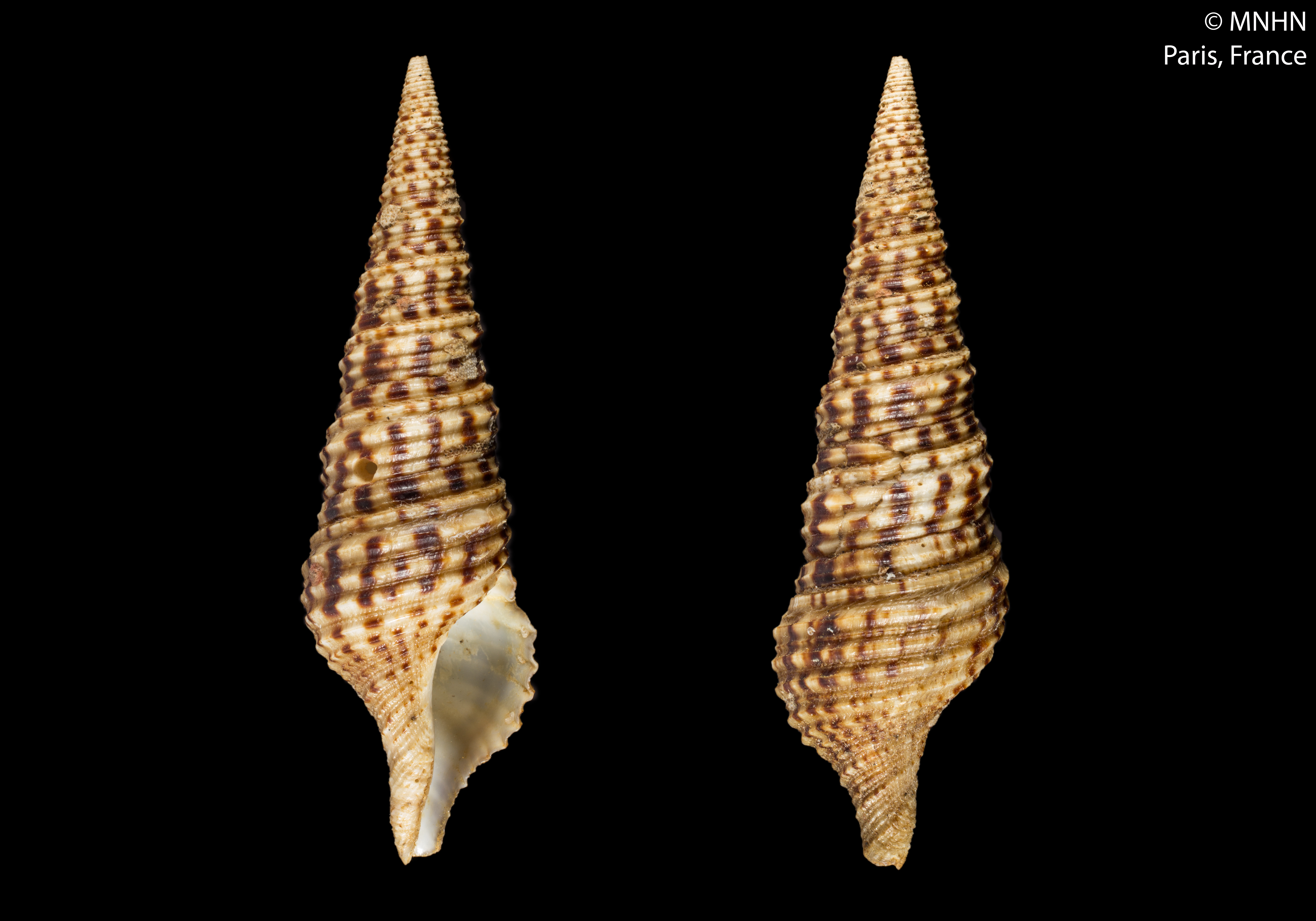
- Shell of Purpuraturris tanyspira (holotype at MNHN? Paris)

Scientific classification
- Kingdom: Animalia
- Phylum: Mollusca
- Class: Gastropoda
- Subclass: Caenogastropoda
- Order: Neogastropoda
- Superfamily: Conoidea
- Family: Turridae
- Genus: Purpuraturris
- Species: P. tanyspira

Binomial name
- Purpuraturris tanyspira (Kilburn, 1975)

Synonyms
- Turris ankaramanyensis Bozzetti, 2006; Turris tanyspira Kilburn, 1975

= Purpuraturris tanyspira =

Species of gastropod

Purpuraturris tanyspira is a species of sea snail, a marine gastropod mollusk in the family Turridae, the turrids.

== Distribution ==
This marine species occurs off Mozambique and Madagascar.
