= Decollidrillia nigra =

Scientific classification
- Kingdom: Animalia
- Phylum: Mollusca
- Class: Gastropoda
- Subclass: Caenogastropoda
- Order: Neogastropoda
- Superfamily: Conoidea
- Family: Turridae
- Genus: Decollidrillia
- Species: D. nigra

Binomial name
- Decollidrillia nigra Habe & Ito, 1965

Species of gastropod

Decollidrillia nigra is a species of sea snail, a marine gastropod mollusk in the family Turridae, the turrids.

== Description ==
The length of the shell varies between 10 mm and 14 mm.

== Distribution ==
This marine species occurs in the Sea of Japan and off the Kuriles, Russia.
