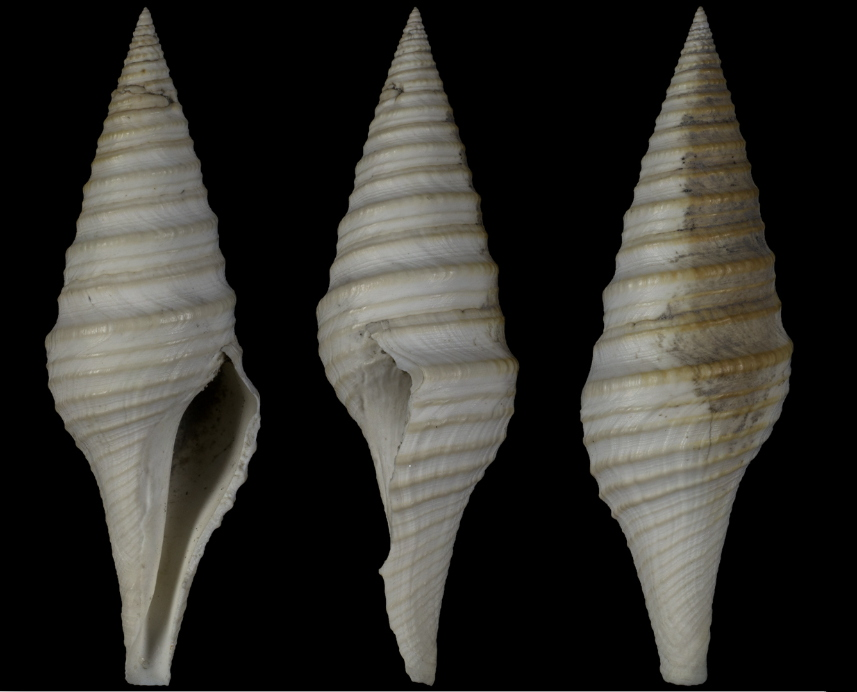
- Shell of † Unedogemmula contigua (specimen at MNHN, Paris)

Scientific classification
- Kingdom: Animalia
- Phylum: Mollusca
- Class: Gastropoda
- Subclass: Caenogastropoda
- Order: Neogastropoda
- Superfamily: Conoidea
- Family: Turridae
- Genus: Unedogemmula
- Species: †U. contigua

Binomial name
- †Unedogemmula contigua (G.B. Brocchi, 1814)

Synonyms
- † Gemmula (Unedogemmula) contigua (Brocchi, 1814)

= Unedogemmula contigua =

Species of gastropod

Unedogemmula contigua is an extinct species of sea snail, a marine gastropod mollusk in the family Turridae, the turrids.

== Description ==
The length of the shell attains 24 mm.

== Distribution ==
This extinct marine species was found in Miocene strata in Italy, Spain and Turkey; in Pliocene strata in Alpes-Maritimes, France.
