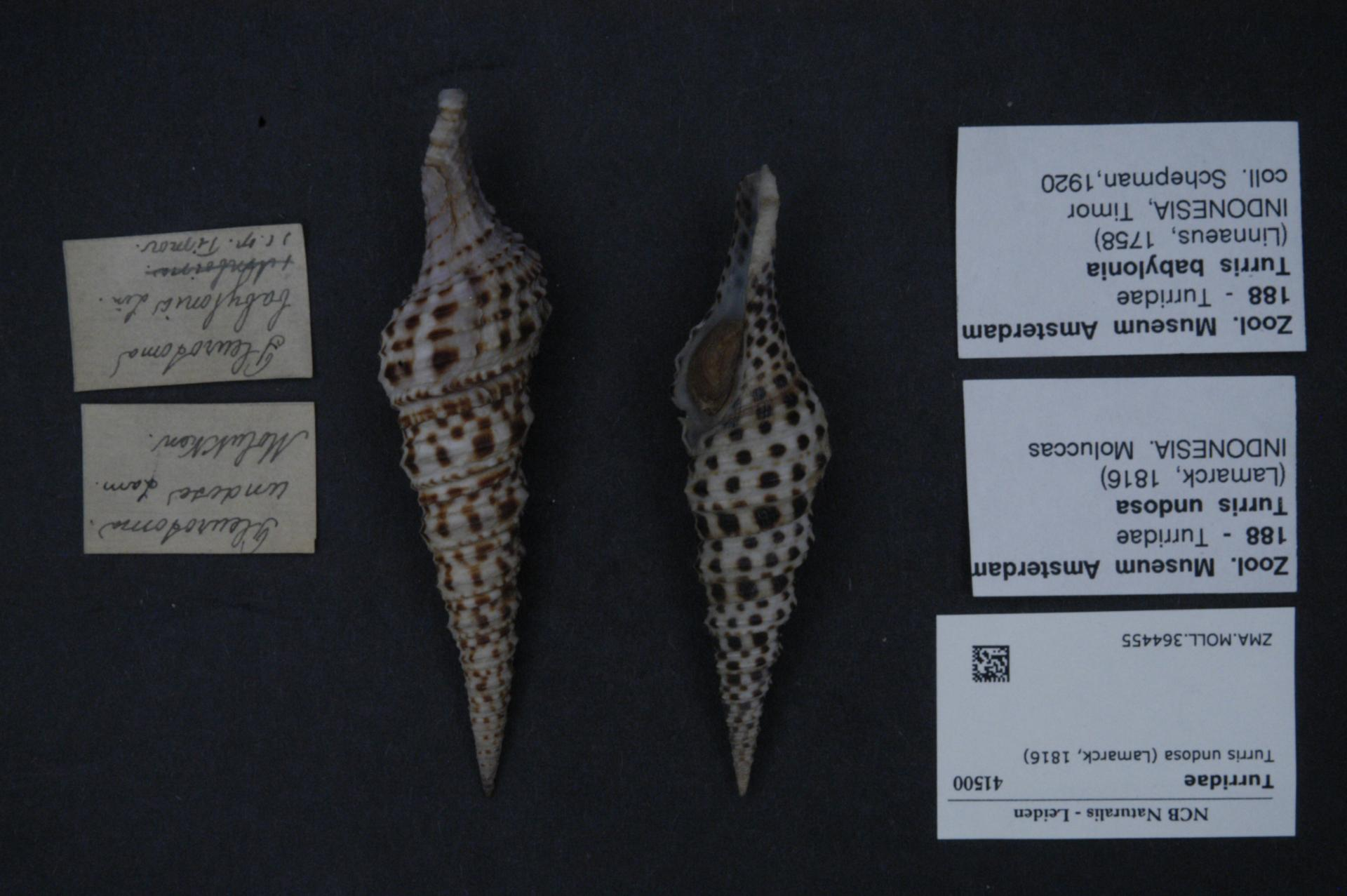

Scientific classification
- Kingdom: Animalia
- Phylum: Mollusca
- Class: Gastropoda
- Subclass: Caenogastropoda
- Order: Neogastropoda
- Superfamily: Conoidea
- Family: Turridae
- Genus: Purpuraturris
- Species: P. undosa

Binomial name
- Purpuraturris undosa (Lamarck, 1816)

Synonyms
- Pleurotoma raffrayi Tapparone Canefri, 1878 (probable synonym); Pleurotoma undosa Lamarck, 1816; Turris undosa (Lamarck, 1816) superseded combination

= Purpuraturris undosa =

Species of gastropod

Purpuraturris undosa is a species of sea snail, a marine gastropod mollusk in the family Turridae, the turrids.
