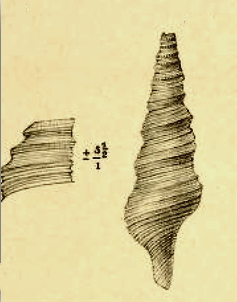
- Shell of Unedogemmula sondeiana (holotype)

Scientific classification
- Kingdom: Animalia
- Phylum: Mollusca
- Class: Gastropoda
- Subclass: Caenogastropoda
- Order: Neogastropoda
- Superfamily: Conoidea
- Family: Turridae
- Genus: Unedogemmula
- Species: U. sondeiana

Binomial name
- Unedogemmula sondeiana (K. Martin, 1895)

Synonyms
- Gemmula sondeiana (K. Martin, 1895); Pleurotoma sondeyana K. Martin, 1895 (orifinal combination)

= Unedogemmula sondeiana =

Species of gastropod

Unedogemmula sondeiana is an extinct species of sea snail, a marine gastropod mollusk in the family Turridae, the turrids.

== Distribution ==
This extinct marine species was found in Pliocene strata in Java, Indonesia.
