= Unedogemmula nuttalli =

Scientific classification
- Kingdom: Animalia
- Phylum: Mollusca
- Class: Gastropoda
- Subclass: Caenogastropoda
- Order: Neogastropoda
- Superfamily: Conoidea
- Family: Turridae
- Genus: Unedogemmula
- Species: U. nuttalli

Binomial name
- Unedogemmula nuttalli Harzhauser, Raven & Landau, 2018

Species of gastropod

Unedogemmula nuttalli is an extinct species of sea snail, a marine gastropod mollusk in the family Turridae, the turrids.

== Distribution ==
This extinct marine species was found in Miocene strata in Brunei.
