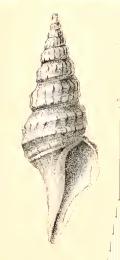
- Original image of a shell of Epidirella xanthophaes

Scientific classification
- Kingdom: Animalia
- Phylum: Mollusca
- Class: Gastropoda
- Subclass: Caenogastropoda
- Order: Neogastropoda
- Superfamily: Conoidea
- Family: Turridae
- Genus: Epidirella
- Species: E. xanthophaes

Binomial name
- Epidirella xanthophaes (R.B. Watson, 1886)

Synonyms
- Austrogemmula tasmanica (May, 1911); Epideira xanthophaes (R. B. Watson, 1886); Epidirella tasmanica (May, 1911); Epidirona xanthophaes (R. B. Watson, 1886); Hemipleurotoma tasmanica May, 1911; Pleurotoma (Hemipleurotoma) tasmanica May, W.L., 1911 (basionym); Pleurotoma xanthophaes Watson, 1886 (original combination)

= Epidirella xanthophaes =

Species of gastropod

Epidirella xanthophaes is a species of sea snail, a marine gastropod mollusk in the family Turridae, the turrids.

== Description ==
The length of the shell varies between 18 mm and 28 mm.

(Original description by R.B. Watson) The shell is high, narrow, fusiform, subscalar, bicarinated, tubercled, fulvous, with brown specks between the carinal tubercles.

Sculpture : Longitudinals — there are rough lines of growth. Spirals—the whole surface is covered with very unequal threads. Immediately below the suture is a broadish thread, puckered by the lines of growth. Below this on the shoulder of the shell there are three feeble threads rather widely and quite shallowly parted. The corner of the shoulder has a strongish rounded keel cut into white blunt tubercles, between which are chestnut spots. Below this keel is a broad and somewhat constricted furrow in which are some (3 to 6) feeble threads. The lower side of the furrow is formed by another keel also tubercled and speckled, but weaker than the upper keel. Between these two keels the shell is cylindrical. From this point it begins to contract, has one feeble thread, then plainly within the base two strongish threads, which are subtubercled. Below this on the front of the base and on the columella are about 10 threads. The point of the columella has no threads, but is very rough.

The colour of the shell is fulvous, with whitish and chestnut specks. The point of the snout is white.

The spire is high, narrow, conical and slopingly scalar. Apex is coronated (?). It is somewhat rubbed, but seems to consist of 3 to 4 whorls. The shell consists of seven whorls, exclusive of those of the apex. They are bicarinated, constricted above and below, of slow aud regular increase. The body whorl is small, with a rounded elongated base and a small somewhat longish siphonal canal. The suture is strongly marked by the constriction above it, and is marginated by the puckered thread below. The aperture is club-shaped. The outer lip is thin, with a sinus strong rather than deep, V-shaped, extending from the suture, and having its apex at the keel. The inner lip is thin, concave above, then direct, and then at the siphonal canal strongly cut off to the left, and having a slight twist on its edge.

== Biology ==
Members of the order Neogastropoda are mostly gonochoric and broadcast spawners. Life cycle: Embryos develop into planktonic trochophore larvae and later into juvenile veligers before becoming fully grown adults.

== Life cycle and mating behavior ==
Embryos develop into planktonic trochophore larvae and later into juvenile veligers before becoming fully grown adults.

== Distribution ==
This marine species occurs off New South Wales and Tasmania, Australia, at depths between 37 m and 161 m.
