= Unedogemmula annae =

Scientific classification
- Kingdom: Animalia
- Phylum: Mollusca
- Class: Gastropoda
- Subclass: Caenogastropoda
- Order: Neogastropoda
- Superfamily: Conoidea
- Family: Turridae
- Genus: Unedogemmula
- Species: U. annae

Binomial name
- Unedogemmula annae (Hoernes & Auinger, 1891)

Synonyms
- Gemmula annae (Hoernes & Auinger, 1891); Pleurotoma annae Hoernes & Auinger, 1891; Turris annae (Hoernes & Auinger, 1891)

Species of gastropod

Unedogemmula annae is an extinct species of sea snail, a marine gastropod mollusk in the family Turridae, the turrids.

== Description ==
The length of the shell attains 8 mm.

== Distribution ==
This extinct marine species was found in Miocene strata in Hungary.
