= Unedogemmula hazarti =

Scientific classification
- Kingdom: Animalia
- Phylum: Mollusca
- Class: Gastropoda
- Subclass: Caenogastropoda
- Order: Neogastropoda
- Superfamily: Conoidea
- Family: Turridae
- Genus: Unedogemmula
- Species: U. hazarti

Binomial name
- Unedogemmula hazarti T. Cossignani, 2021

Species of gastropod

Unedogemmula hazarti is a species of sea snail, a marine gastropod mollusk in the family Turridae, the turrids.

== Distribution ==
This marine species occurs off Norfolk Island.
