= Crassispira tyloessa =

Scientific classification
- Kingdom: Animalia
- Phylum: Mollusca
- Class: Gastropoda
- Subclass: Caenogastropoda
- Order: Neogastropoda
- Superfamily: Conoidea
- Family: Pseudomelatomidae
- Genus: Crassispira
- Species: C. tyloessa

Binomial name
- Crassispira tyloessa W. P. Woodring, 1970

Synonyms
- † Crassispira (Crassispirella) tyloessa Woodring 1970

Extinct species of gastropod

Crassispira tyloessa is an extinct species of sea snail, a marine gastropod mollusk in the family Pseudomelatomidae which comprises the turrids and allies.

== Description ==
The length of the shell attains 13.4 mm, its diameter 5.8 mm.

== Distribution ==
Fossils have been found in Gatun formation Miocene strata in Panama; age range: 11.608 to 7.246 Ma.
