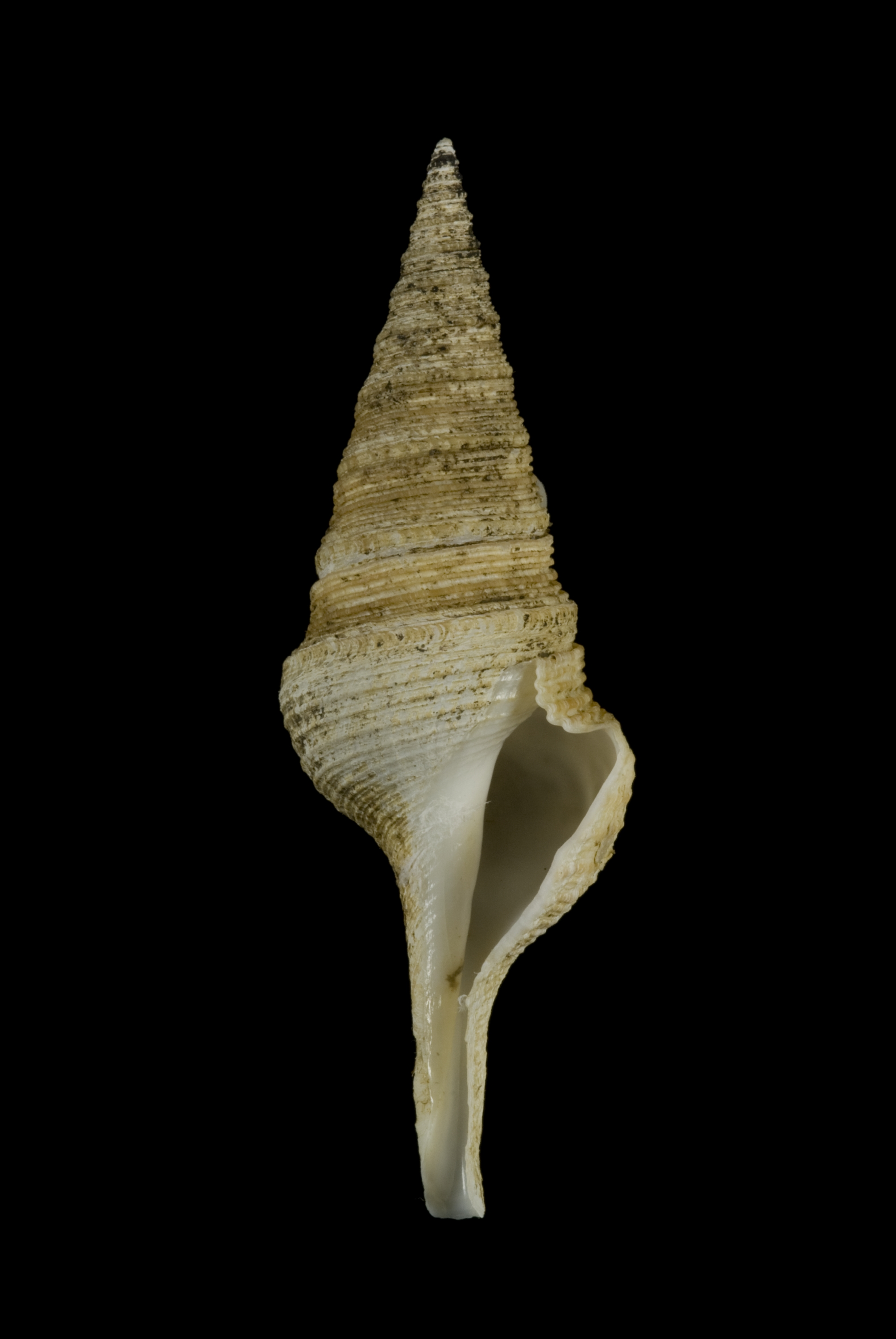
- Shell of Unedogemmula indica (specimen at MNHN, Paris)

Scientific classification
- Kingdom: Animalia
- Phylum: Mollusca
- Class: Gastropoda
- Subclass: Caenogastropoda
- Order: Neogastropoda
- Superfamily: Conoidea
- Family: Turridae
- Genus: Unedogemmula; MacNeil, 1961

Type species
- Pleurotoma unedo Kiener, 1839

Synonyms
- Gemmula (Unedogemmula) MacNeil, 1961; Lophioturris Powell, 1964

= Unedogemmula =

Genus of gastropods

Unedogemmula is a genus of sea snails, marine gastropod mollusks in the family Turridae, the turrids.

== Distribution ==
Species in this genus occur in the Indo-West Pacific and off Australia.

== Species ==
Species within the genus Unedogemmula include:

- † Unedogemmula annae (Hoernes & Auinger, 1891)
- † Unedogemmula bemmeleni (Oostingh, 1941)
- Unedogemmula bisaya (B. M. Olivera, 2004)
- † Unedogemmula boreoturricula (F. Kautsky, 1925)
- † Unedogemmula contigua (G.B. Brocchi, 1814 )
- † Unedogemmula hanseata (F. Kautsky, 1925)
- Unedogemmula hazarti T. Cossignani, 2021
- Unedogemmula ina McNeil, 1961
- Unedogemmula indica (Röding, 1798)
- Unedogemmula koolhoveni (Oostingh, 1938)
- † Unedogemmula nuttalli Harzhauser, Raven & Landau, 2018
- † Unedogemmula sondeiana (K. Martin, 1895)
- † Unedogemmula stoffelsi (P. Nyst, 1845)
- Unedogemmula unedo (Kiener, 1839)

Synonyms

- Unedogemmula binda (T.A. Garrard, 1961): synonym of Unedogemmula unedo (Kiener, 1839)
- Unedogemmula deshayesii (Doumet, 1840): synonym of Deceptigemmula deshayesii (Doumet, 1840)
- Unedogemmula elongata J.E. Gray & G.B. I Sowerby, 1839: synonym of Unedogemmula deshayesii (E. Doumet, 1840): synonym of Deceptigemmula deshayesii (Doumet, 1840)
- Unedogemmula trypanodes J.C. Melvill, 1904:synonym of Gemmula hastula (L.A. Reeve, 1843)
