= Unedogemmula bemmeleni =

Scientific classification
- Kingdom: Animalia
- Phylum: Mollusca
- Class: Gastropoda
- Subclass: Caenogastropoda
- Order: Neogastropoda
- Superfamily: Conoidea
- Family: Turridae
- Genus: Unedogemmula
- Species: U. bemmeleni

Binomial name
- Unedogemmula bemmeleni (Oostingh, 1941)

Species of gastropod

Unedogemmula bemmeleni is an extinct species of sea snail, a marine gastropod mollusk in the family Turridae, the turrids.

== Distribution ==
This extinct marine species was found in Miocene strata in Borneo.
