= Mcleanigemmula ioannisi =

Scientific classification
- Kingdom: Animalia
- Phylum: Mollusca
- Class: Gastropoda
- Subclass: Caenogastropoda
- Order: Neogastropoda
- Superfamily: Conoidea
- Family: Turridae
- Genus: Mcleanigemmula
- Species: M. ioannisi

Binomial name
- Mcleanigemmula ioannisi Kantor, Bouchet, Fedosov, Puillandre & Zaharias, 2024

Species of gastropod

Mcleanigemmula ioannisi is a species of sea snail, a marine gastropod mollusk in the family Turridae, the turrids.

== Distribution ==
This marine species occurs in the Bismarck Sea.
