= Alisigemmula astrolabiensis =

Scientific classification
- Kingdom: Animalia
- Phylum: Mollusca
- Class: Gastropoda
- Subclass: Caenogastropoda
- Order: Neogastropoda
- Superfamily: Conoidea
- Family: Turridae
- Genus: Alisigemmula
- Species: A. astrolabiensis

Binomial name
- Alisigemmula astrolabiensis Kantor, Bouchet, Fedosov, Puillandre & Zaharias, 2024

Species of gastropod

Alisigemmula astrolabiensis is a species of sea snail, a marine gastropod mollusk in the family Turridae, the turrids.

== Etymology ==
The species name refers to the type locality, Astrolabe Bay, as well as paying tribute to L'Astrolabe, the famous ship of Commander Jules Sébastien César Dumont d'Urville, after which the bay was named.

== Distribution ==
This marine species occurs in the Bismarck Sea
