= Unedogemmula ina =

Scientific classification
- Kingdom: Animalia
- Phylum: Mollusca
- Class: Gastropoda
- Subclass: Caenogastropoda
- Order: Neogastropoda
- Superfamily: Conoidea
- Family: Turridae
- Genus: Unedogemmula
- Species: U. ina

Binomial name
- Unedogemmula ina McNeil, 1961

Species of gastropod

Unedogemmula ina is a species of sea snail, a marine gastropod mollusk in the family Turridae, the turrids.

== Taxonomy ==
The species was transferred to Unedogemmula by Powell (1964). Later it was found alive and transferred to Lophiotoma by Li & Li (2008) who synonymized Unedogemmula with Lophiotoma.

== Description ==
The length of the shell attains 40.2 mm.

== Distribution ==
Fossils of this marine species were found in Miocene strata in Okinawa.
