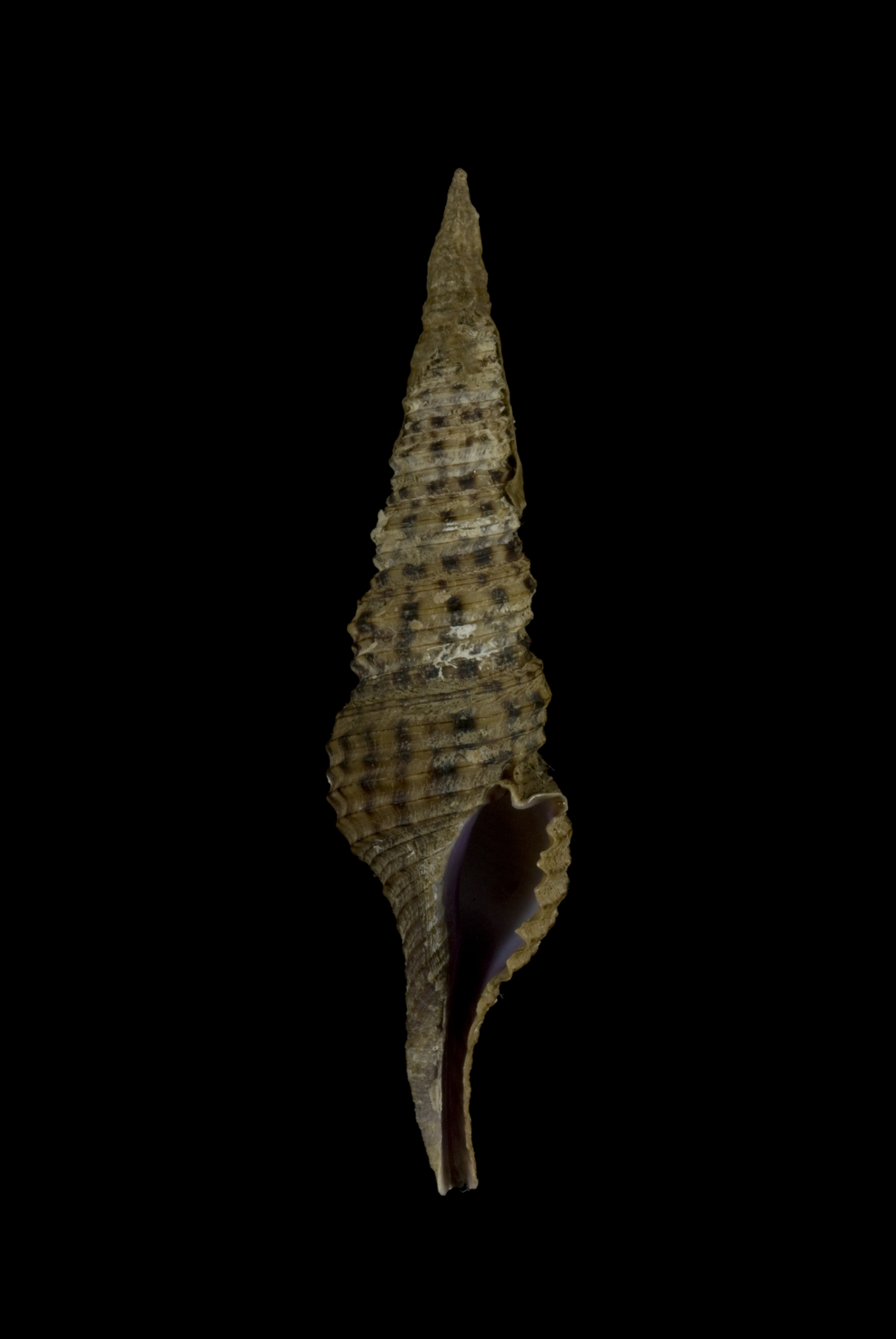
- Shell of Purpuraturris nadaensis (specimen at MNHN, Paris)

Scientific classification
- Kingdom: Animalia
- Phylum: Mollusca
- Class: Gastropoda
- Subclass: Caenogastropoda
- Order: Neogastropoda
- Superfamily: Conoidea
- Family: Turridae
- Genus: Purpuraturris
- Species: P. nadaensis

Binomial name
- Purpuraturris nadaensis (Azuma, 1973)

Synonyms
- Turris nadaensis M. Azuma, 1973

= Purpuraturris nadaensis =

Species of gastropod

Purpuraturris nadaensis is a species of sea snail, a marine gastropod mollusk in the family Turridae, the turrids.

== Description ==
The length of the shell varies between 57 mm and 87 mm.

== Distribution ==
This marine species occurs off the Philippines and Japan.
