= Unedogemmula stoffelsi =

Scientific classification
- Kingdom: Animalia
- Phylum: Mollusca
- Class: Gastropoda
- Subclass: Caenogastropoda
- Order: Neogastropoda
- Superfamily: Conoidea
- Family: Turridae
- Genus: Unedogemmula
- Species: U. stoffelsi

Binomial name
- Unedogemmula stoffelsi (P. Nyst, 1845)

Synonyms
- Gemmula (Unedogemmula) stoffelsi (P. Nyst, 1845); Pleurotoma stoffelsi P. Nyst, 1845 (orifinal combination); Pleurotoma woodi P. Nyst, 1845

Species of gastropod

Unedogemmula stoffelsi is an extinct species of sea snail, a marine gastropod mollusk in the family Turridae, the turrids.

== Description ==
The length of the shell attains 15 mm.

== Distribution ==
This extinct marine species was found in Miocene strata in Belgium.
