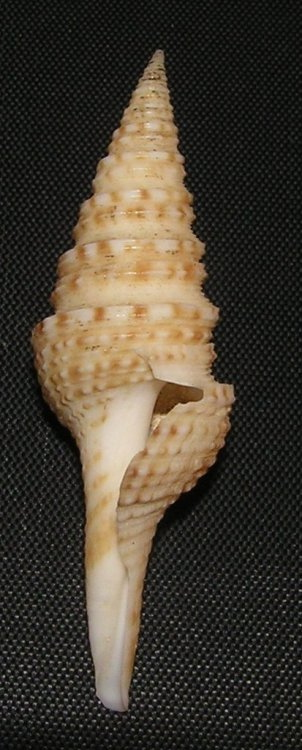
- Shell of Unedogemmula bisaya

Scientific classification
- Kingdom: Animalia
- Phylum: Mollusca
- Class: Gastropoda
- Subclass: Caenogastropoda
- Order: Neogastropoda
- Superfamily: Conoidea
- Family: Turridae
- Genus: Unedogemmula
- Species: U. bisaya

Binomial name
- Unedogemmula bisaya (Olivera, 2004

Synonyms
- Gemmula (Unedogemmula) bisaya (Olivera, 2004); Lophiotoma bisaya B. M. Olivera, 2004

= Unedogemmula bisaya =

Species of gastropod

Unedogemmula bisaya is a species of sea snail, a marine gastropod mollusk in the family Turridae, also known as the turrids.

== Description ==
The length of the shell varies between 40 mm and 75 mm. The species is a non-broadcast spawner and its biological life cycle does not include the trocophore stage of life. The peptide called turripedtide ubi3a was isolated from Unedogemmula bisaya. The peptide when injected intracranially into mice caused prolonged tremors.

== Distribution ==
This marine species lives in the western central pacific ocean and occurs off the Philippines in benthic or tropical zones.
