= Alisigemmula =

Scientific classification
- Kingdom: Animalia
- Phylum: Mollusca
- Class: Gastropoda
- Subclass: Caenogastropoda
- Order: Neogastropoda
- Superfamily: Conoidea
- Family: Turridae
- Genus: Alisigemmula; Kantor, Bouchet, Fedosov, Puillandre & Zaharias, 2024

Type species
- Alisigemmula astrolabiensis Kantor, Bouchet, Fedosov, Puillandre & Zaharias, 2024

Genus of gastropods

Alisigemmula is a genus of marine gastropod molluscs or micromolluscs in the family Turridae, the turrids.

== Etymology ==
The genus is named after the research vessel Alis, which, under captains Raymond Proner, Hervé Le Houarneau and Jean-François Barazer, conducted numerous biodiversity surveys in the South Pacific, leading to the discovery of many new species of marine molluscs.

== Species ==
- Alisigemmula astrolabiensis Kantor, Bouchet, Fedosov, Puillandre & Zaharias, 2024
