= Shutogemmula =

Scientific classification
- Kingdom: Animalia
- Phylum: Mollusca
- Class: Gastropoda
- Subclass: Caenogastropoda
- Order: Neogastropoda
- Family: Turridae
- Genus: Shutogemmula
- Species: S. solomonensis

Binomial name
- Shutogemmula solomonensis Kantor, Bouchet, Fedosov, Puillandre & Zaharias, 2024

Genus of gastropods

Shutogemmula is a genus of sea snails, marine gastropod mollusks in the family Turridae, the turrids.

Its only species is Shutogemmula solomonensis.

== Distribution ==
This marine species occurs off the Solomon Islands.

== Bibliography ==
- Kantor, Y., Bouchet, P., Fedosov, A., Puillandre, N. & Zaharias, P. (2024). Generic revision of the Recent Turridae (Neogastropoda: Conoidea). Journal of Molluscan Studies. eyae032: 1-40.
