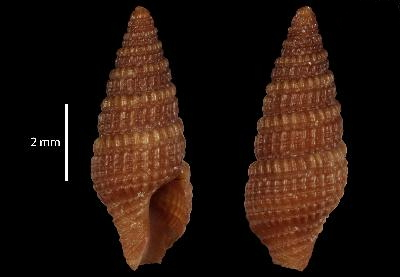
- Shell of Scaevatula amancioi (paratype in the MNHN, Paris)

Conservation status
- Data Deficient (IUCN 2.3)

Scientific classification
- Kingdom: Animalia
- Phylum: Mollusca
- Class: Gastropoda
- Subclass: Caenogastropoda
- Order: Neogastropoda
- Superfamily: Conoidea
- Family: Clavatulidae
- Genus: Scaevatula
- Species: S. amancioi

Binomial name
- Scaevatula amancioi Rolan & Fernandes, 1992

= Scaevatula amancioi =

Species of gastropod

Scaevatula amancioi is a species of sea snail, a marine gastropod mollusk in the family Clavatulidae.

== Distribution ==
This species is endemic to São Tomé and Príncipe.
