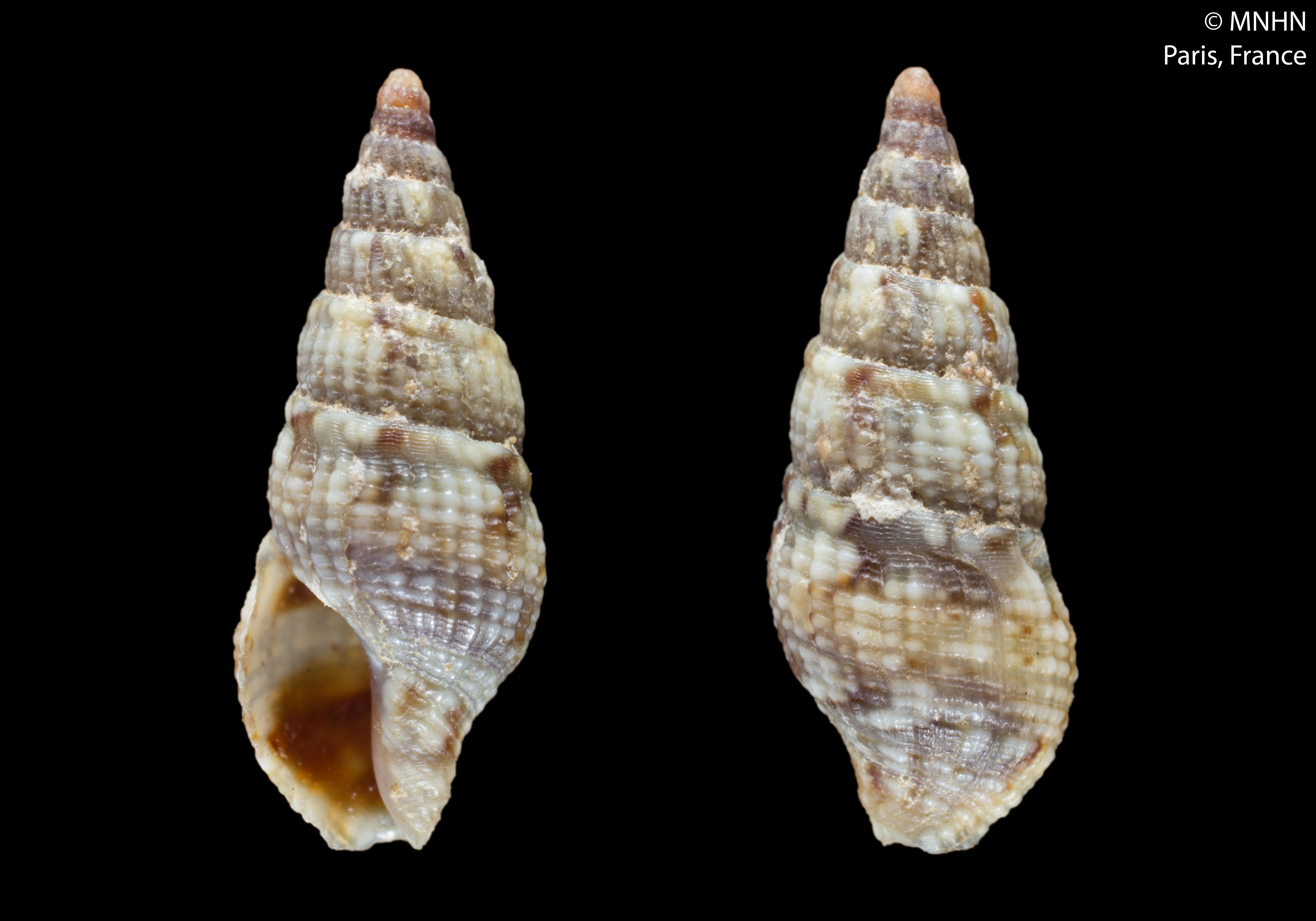

Conservation status
- Data Deficient (IUCN 2.3)

Scientific classification
- Kingdom: Animalia
- Phylum: Mollusca
- Class: Gastropoda
- Subclass: Caenogastropoda
- Order: Neogastropoda
- Superfamily: Conoidea
- Family: Clavatulidae
- Genus: Scaevatula
- Species: S. pellisserpentis

Binomial name
- Scaevatula pellisserpentis Gofas, 1990

= Scaevatula pellisserpentis =

Species of gastropod

Scaevatula pellisserpentis is a species of small predatory sea snail, a marine gastropod mollusk in the family Clavatulidae.

== Description ==
The shell grows to a length of 8 mm. Its whorls are sinistral.

== Distribution ==
This marine species is endemic to São Tomé and Príncipe.
