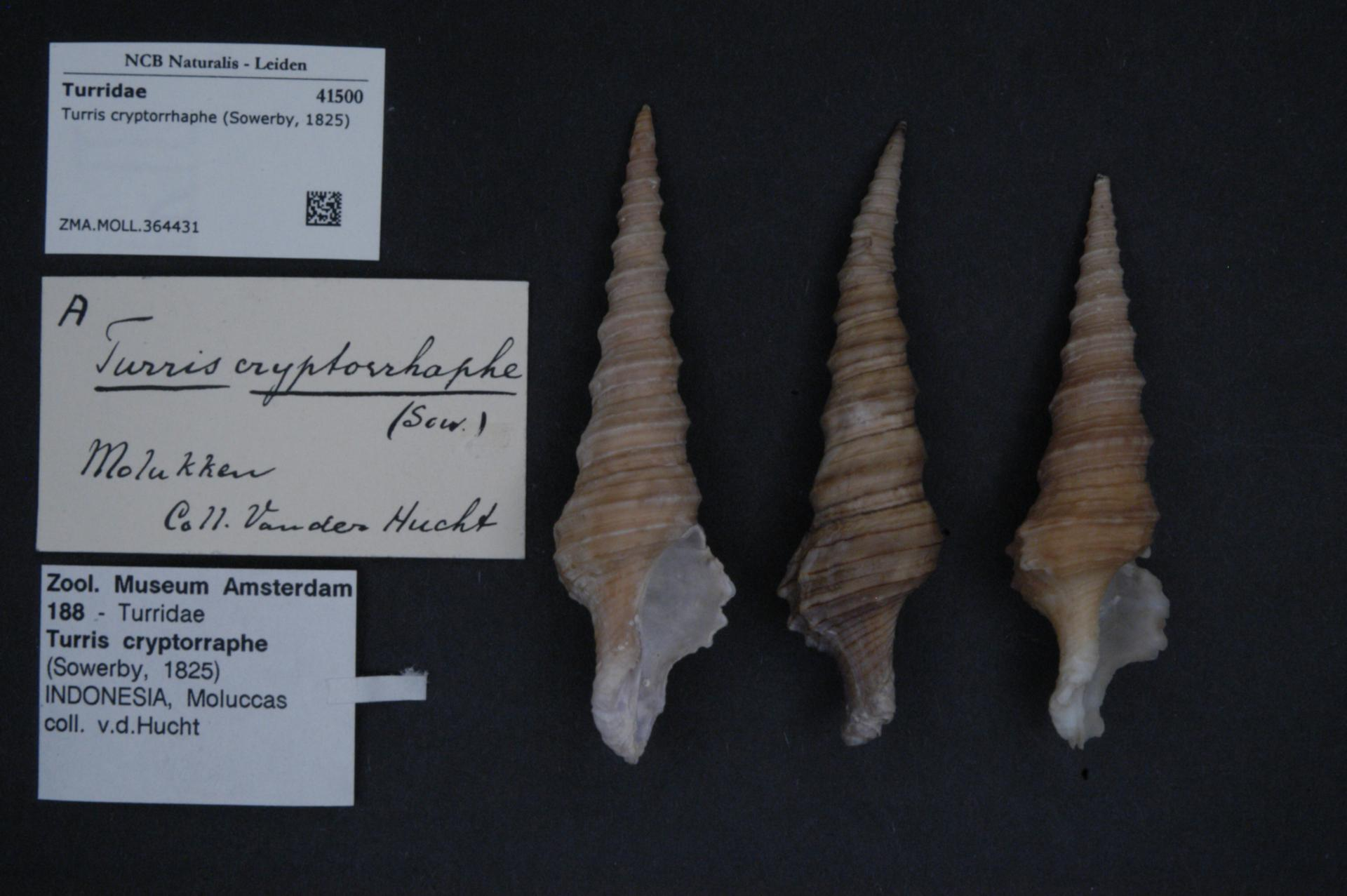
- Shell of Purpuraturris cryptorrhaphe (specimen at Naturalis Biodiversity Center)

Scientific classification
- Kingdom: Animalia
- Phylum: Mollusca
- Class: Gastropoda
- Subclass: Caenogastropoda
- Order: Neogastropoda
- Superfamily: Conoidea
- Family: Turridae
- Genus: Purpuraturris; K. Chase, Watkins, Safavi-Hemami & B. M. Olivera, 2022

Type species
- Pleurotoma cryptorrhaphe G. B. Sowerby I, 1825

Species
- See text

= Purpuraturris =

Genus of gastropods

Purpuraturris is a taxonomic family name for a number of predatory sea snails, marine gastropod mollusks in the family Turridae.

== Species ==
- Purpuraturris cristata (Vera-Peláez, Vega-Luz & Lozano-Francisco, 2000)
- Purpuraturris cryptorraphe (G. B. Sowerby I, 1825)
- Purpuraturris nadensis (M. Azuma, 1973)
- Purpuraturris omnipurpurata (Vera-Peláez, Vega-Luz & Lozano-Francisco, 2000)
- Purpuraturris tanyspira (Kilburn, 1975)
- Purpuraturris undosa (Lamarck, 1816)
