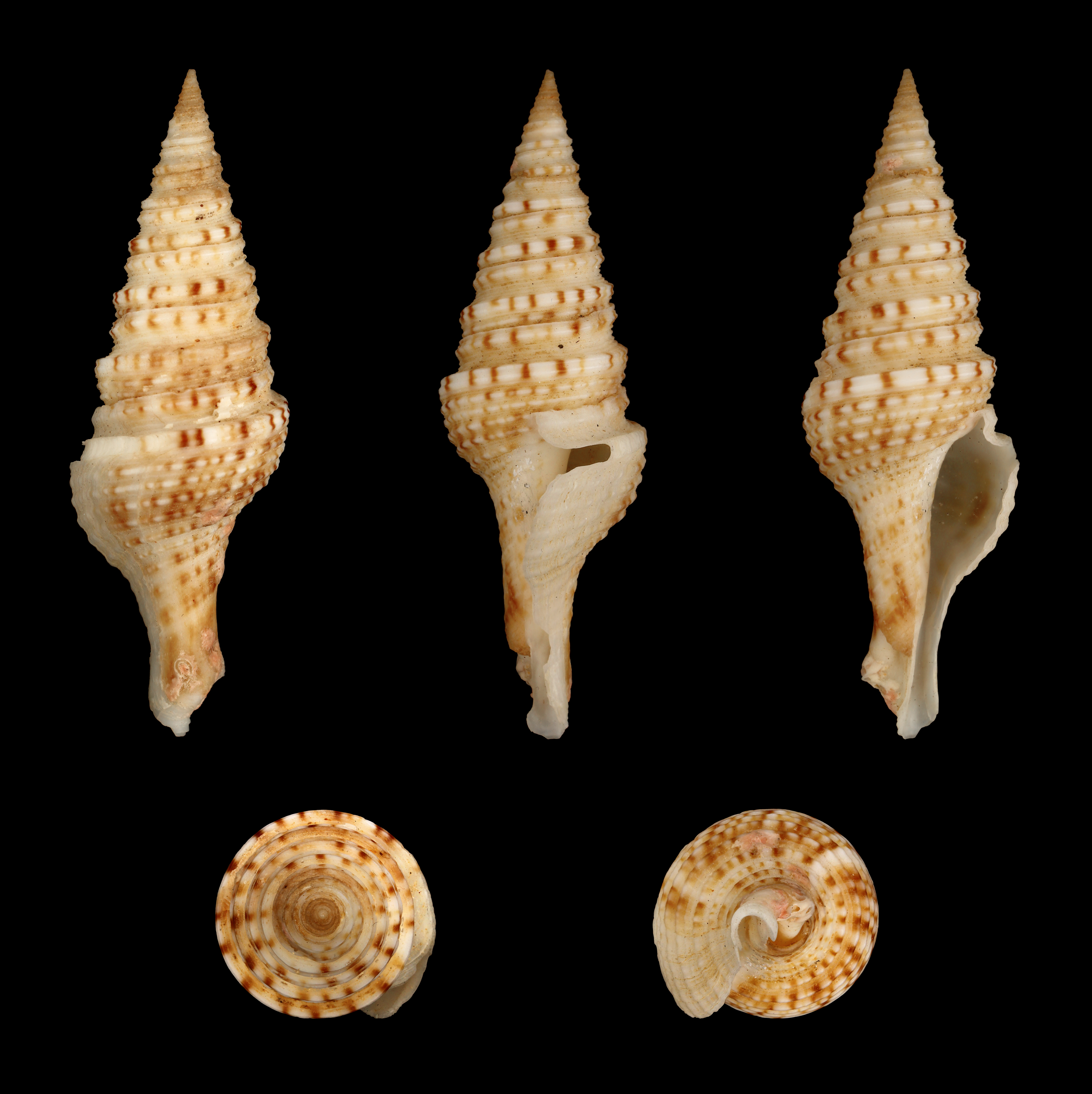
- Shell of Unedogemmula gemmula

Scientific classification
- Kingdom: Animalia
- Phylum: Mollusca
- Class: Gastropoda
- Subclass: Caenogastropoda
- Order: Neogastropoda
- Superfamily: Conoidea
- Family: Turridae
- Genus: Unedogemmula
- Species: U. unedo

Binomial name
- Unedogemmula unedo (Kiener, 1839)

Synonyms
- Gemmula unedo (Kiener, 1839); Gemmula (Unedogemmula) unedo (Kiener, 1839); Pleurotoma unedo Kiener, 1839; Turris binda Garrard, 1961; Turris invicta Melvill, J.C. 1910; Turris unedo (Kiener, 1839)

= Unedogemmula unedo =

Species of gastropod

Unedogemmula unedo is a species of sea snail, a marine gastropod mollusk in the family Turridae, the turrids.

== Description ==
The length of the shell attains 49.7 mm.

== Distribution ==
This marine species occurs off the Philippines, New Caledonia, the Solomon Islands; in the East China Sea; off Indonesia, Taiwan, Japan; off Northern Territory, Queensland, Western Australia (Australia).
