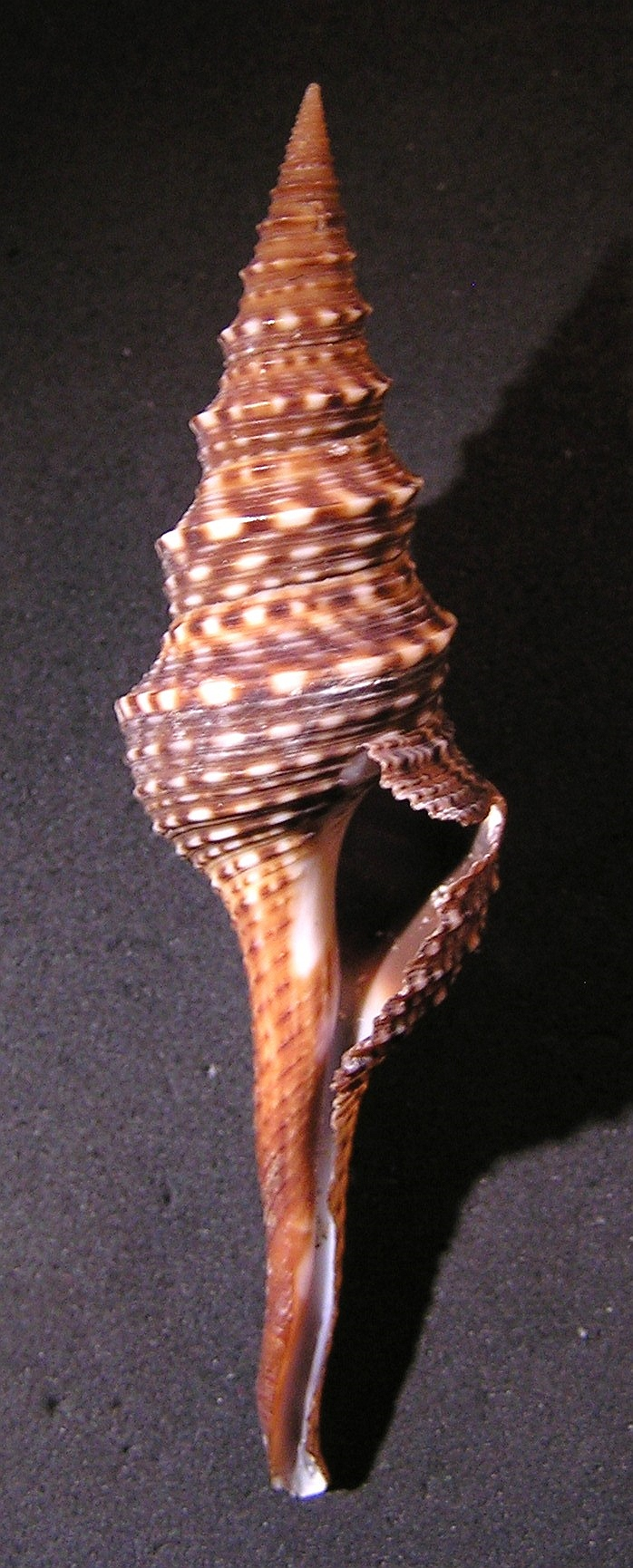
- Apertural view of Unedogemmula indica

Scientific classification
- Kingdom: Animalia
- Phylum: Mollusca
- Class: Gastropoda
- Subclass: Caenogastropoda
- Order: Neogastropoda
- Family: Turridae
- Genus: Unedogemmula
- Species: U. indica

Binomial name
- Unedogemmula indica (Röding, 1798)

Synonyms
- Lophiotoma (Lophiotoma) indica (Röding, 1798); Lophiotoma indica (Röding, 1798); Lophiotoma indica f. bulowi (G. B. Sowerby III, 1888); Lophioturris indica (Röding, 1798); Pleurotoma bulowi Sowerby, G.B. III, 1888; Pleurotoma indica Deshayes; Pleurotoma marmorata Link, H.F., 1807 (nomen dubium); Pleurotoma neglecta Reeve, L.A., 1842; Turris indica Röding, 1798 (original combination)

= Unedogemmula indica =

Species of gastropod

Unedogemmula indica, common name the Indian turrid, is a species of sea snail, a marine gastropod mollusk in the family Turridae, the turrids.

There is one subspecies: Lophiotoma indica queenslandica Olivera, 2004 (as of 2021, not yet renamed)

== Description ==
The size of an adult shell varies between 35 mm and 90 mm. The fusiform shell is somewhat less ridged and striated and has a long siphonal canal. The shoulder angle is very slight, the central ridge forming a carina. The other revolving ridges are smaller and closer than other species in this genus. The color of the shell is yellowish-brown, sometimes indistinctly marbled or variegated.

The length of the fusiform shell is 65 mm, the diameter 20 mm. The shell is covered with sharply carinated whorls, the carina (= a prominent knife-edge ridge) consisting of a pair of narrow ribs. The whole surface is covered with close, raised revolving lines, of which two or three below the carina are more prominent. The color of the shell is whitish with minutely numerously brown-spots and with usually a row of larger spots below the suture.

== Distribution ==
This marine species occurs in the Mascarene Basin and off Madagascar; off Sri Lanka, the Philippines, in the South China Sea, off Australia and the Fiji Islands.
