= Kurilohadalia elongata =

Scientific classification
- Kingdom: Animalia
- Phylum: Mollusca
- Class: Gastropoda
- Subclass: Caenogastropoda
- Order: Neogastropoda
- Superfamily: Conoidea
- Family: Pseudomelatomidae
- Genus: Kurilohadalia
- Species: K. elongata

Binomial name
- Kurilohadalia elongata Sysoev & Kantor, 1986

Species of gastropod

Kurilohadalia elongata is a species of sea snail, a marine gastropod mollusk in the family Pseudomelatomidae, the turrids and allies.

== Distribution ==
This marine species was found in the Kuril–Kamchatka Trench, Northern Pacific Ocean
