= Mcleanigemmula =

Scientific classification
- Kingdom: Animalia
- Phylum: Mollusca
- Class: Gastropoda
- Subclass: Caenogastropoda
- Order: Neogastropoda
- Superfamily: Conoidea
- Family: Turridae
- Genus: Mcleanigemmula; Kantor, Bouchet, Fedosov, Puillandre & Zaharias, 2024

Type species
- Mcleanigemmula ioannisi Kantor, Bouchet, Fedosov, Puillandre & Zaharias, 2024

Genus of gastropods

Mcleanigemmula, common name the gem turrids, is a genus of sea snails, marine gastropod mollusks in the family Turridae, the turrids.

== Etymology ==
The genus is named after (Jim) Hamilton McLean (1936–2016), a prominent malacologist and author of a classification of the Turridae s.l.

== Species ==
- Mcleanigemmula ioannisi Kantor, Bouchet, Fedosov, Puillandre & Zaharias, 2024
