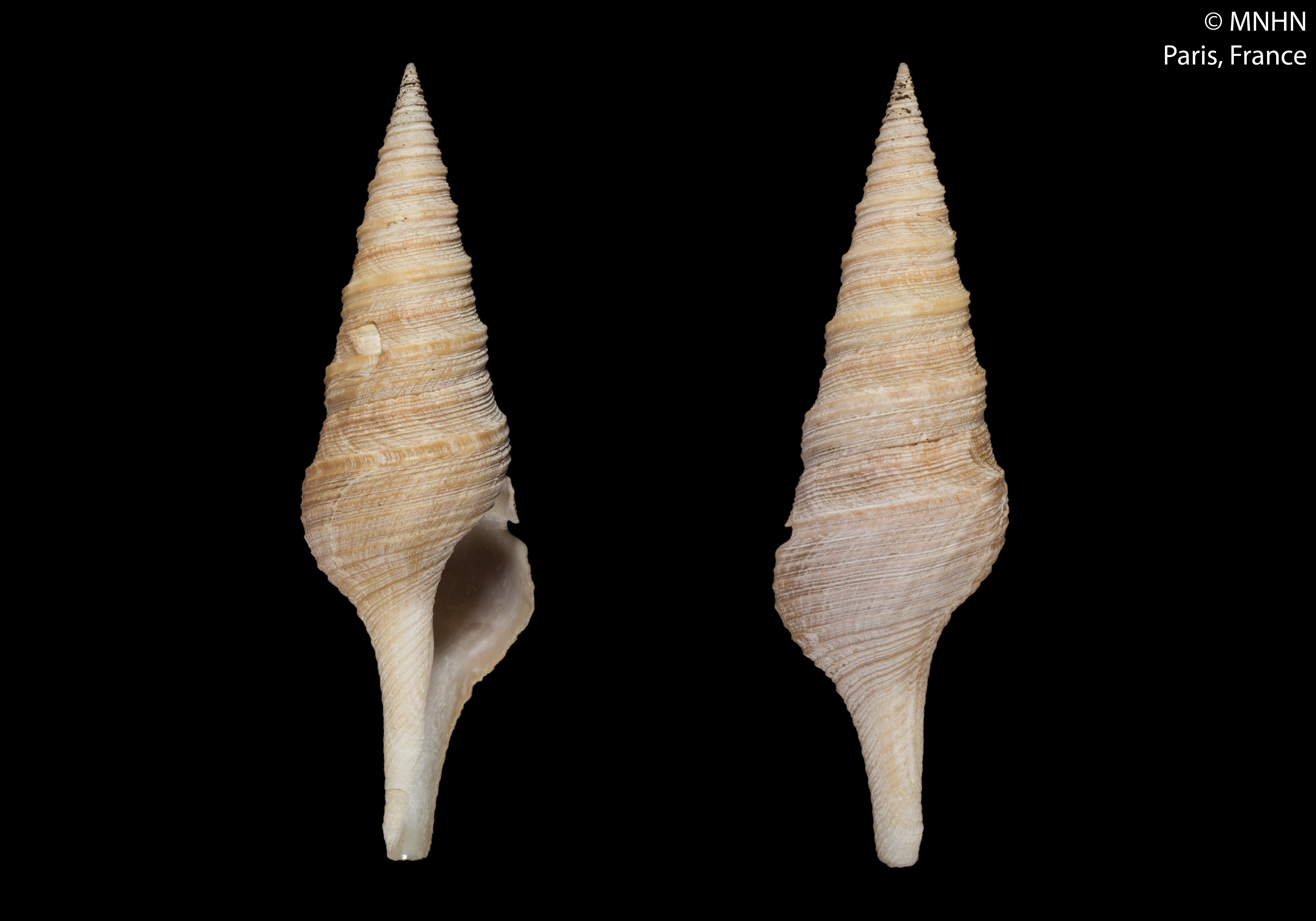
- Deceptigemmula deshayesii shells

Scientific classification
- Kingdom: Animalia
- Phylum: Mollusca
- Class: Gastropoda
- Subclass: Caenogastropoda
- Order: Neogastropoda
- Superfamily: Conoidea
- Family: Turridae
- Genus: Deceptigemmula
- Species: D. deshayesii

Binomial name
- Deceptigemmula deshayesii (Doumet, 1840)

Synonyms
- Gemmula deshayesii (Doumet, 1840); Gemmula (Unedogemmula) deshayesii Powell 1964; Lophiotoma deshayesii (Doumet, 1839); Pleurotoma deshayesii Doumet, 1840; Pleurotoma indica Tryon, 1884 - not Deshayes, 1833; Turris polytropa Kira 1971; Unedogemmula elongata J.E. Gray & G.B. I Sowerby, 1839; Unedogemmula deshayesii (Doumet, 1840) superseded combination

= Deceptigemmula deshayesii =

Species of gastropod

Deceptigemmula deshayesii is a species of sea snail, a marine gastropod mollusk in the family Turridae, the turrids.

== Description ==
The length of the shell attains 66.9 mm.

(Original description in Latin) The shell is elongately turretted. It is yellowish-brown, sparsely undulated with whitish longitudinal flames. The whorls are convex, scarcely depressed at the sutures, and encircled by slender grooves and a bicarinate and superiorly flattened zone. The aperture is oblong and whitish. The outer lip is somewhat denticulate and deeply fissured. The siphonal canal is rather long, slender, and flexuous at the base.

== Distribution ==
This marine species occurs in the East China Sea, South China Sea; off Japan, Vietnam and the Philippines.
