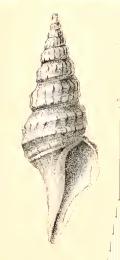
- Epidirella xanthophaes

Scientific classification
- Kingdom: Animalia
- Phylum: Mollusca
- Class: Gastropoda
- Subclass: Caenogastropoda
- Order: Neogastropoda
- Family: Turridae
- Genus: Epidirella; Iredale, 1913

Type species
- Hemipleurotoma tasmanica May, 1911

Synonyms
- Austrogemmula Laseron, 1954 (junior objective synonym)

= Epidirella =

Genus of gastropods

Epidirella is a genus of sea snails, marine gastropod mollusks in the family Turridae, the turrids.

== Species ==
Species within the genus Epidirella include:

- Epidirella xanthophaes (R.B. Watson, 1886)

Species brought into synonymy

- Epidirella tasmanica (May, 1911): synonym of Epidirella xanthophaes (R. B. Watson, 1886)
