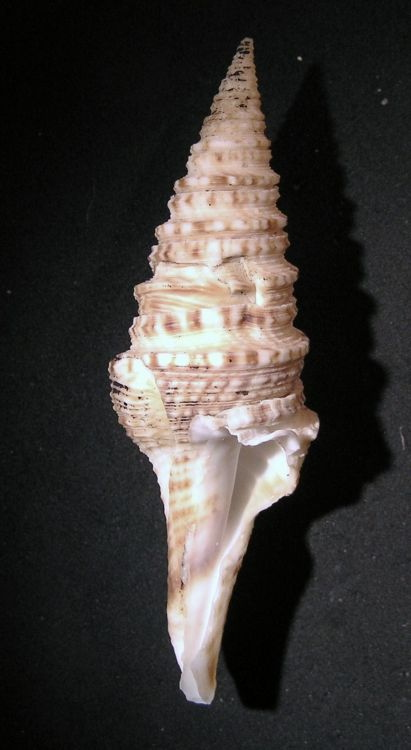
- Shell of Deceptigemmula hastula

Scientific classification
- Kingdom: Animalia
- Phylum: Mollusca
- Class: Gastropoda
- Subclass: Caenogastropoda
- Order: Neogastropoda
- Superfamily: Conoidea
- Family: Turridae
- Genus: Deceptigemmula
- Species: D. hastula

Binomial name
- Deceptigemmula hastula (Reeve, 1843)

Synonyms
- Gemmula hastula (Reeve, 1843) superseded combination; Gemmula (Unedogemmula) hastula (Reeve, 1843); Pleurotoma hastula Reeve, 1843; Pleurotoma trypanodes Melvill, J.C., 1904; Turris (Tomopleura) trypanodes Melvill, 1904; Unedogemmula trypanodes J.C. Melvill, 1904

= Deceptigemmula hastula =

Species of gastropod

Deceptigemmula hastula is a species of sea snail, a marine gastropod mollusk in the family Turridae, the turrids.

== Description ==
The length of the shell varies between 25 mm and 39 mm.

(Original description by Reeve) The small and slender has an elongate-fusiform shape with a long, almost straight siphonal canal. This species is chiefly characterized by the stout double ridge that encircles each whorl near the suture, and by the central ridge that is formed in place of the slit as the shell advances in growth. The whitish shell is axially marked and diffused with yellowish-brown spots.

(Description by Melvill) An elegant tornate species, with produced siphonal canal, and spiral ribbing somewhat similar to that of Tomopleura nivea (Philippi, 1851), but more regular. The shell is white, tinted yellowish around the upper double carinae of each whorl. Just below the sutures these carinae are spirally deeply punctulate, an item omitted in the original description. As regards the nuclear whorls, the first two are vitreous, globular, smooth, and shining, the two next, also vitreous, but spirally nodulous.

== Distribution ==
This marine species occurs in the Persian Gulf, the Arabian Sea and off the Philippines
