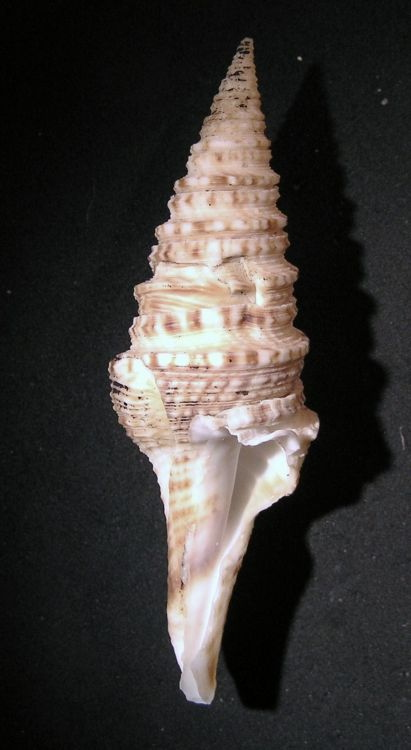
- Shell of Deceptigemmula hastula

Scientific classification
- Kingdom: Animalia
- Phylum: Mollusca
- Class: Gastropoda
- Subclass: Caenogastropoda
- Order: Neogastropoda
- Superfamily: Conoidea
- Family: Turridae
- Genus: Deceptigemmula; Kantor, Bouchet, Fedosov, Puillandre & Zaharias, 2024

Type species
- Pleurotoma hastula Reeve, 1843

= Deceptigemmula =

Genus of gastropods

Deceptigemmula is a genus of marine gastropod molluscs or micromolluscs in the family Turridae, the turrids.

== Species ==
- Deceptigemmula deshayesii (Doumet, 1840)
- Deceptigemmula hastula (Reeve, 1843)
