= Benthoclionella jenneri =

Scientific classification
- Kingdom: Animalia
- Phylum: Mollusca
- Class: Gastropoda
- Subclass: Caenogastropoda
- Order: Neogastropoda
- Superfamily: Conoidea
- Family: Clavatulidae
- Genus: Benthoclionella
- Species: B. jenneri

Binomial name
- Benthoclionella jenneri Kilburn, 1974

Species of gastropod

Benthoclionella jenneri, common name Jenner's turrid, is a species of sea snail, a marine gastropod mollusk in the family Clavatulidae.

== Description ==
The shell grows to a length of 60 mm.

== Distribution ==
This marine species occurs off KwaZuluNatal, South Africa.
