= Decollidrillia =

Scientific classification
- Kingdom: Animalia
- Phylum: Mollusca
- Class: Gastropoda
- Subclass: Caenogastropoda
- Order: Neogastropoda
- Superfamily: Conoidea
- Family: Turridae
- Genus: Decollidrillia; Habe & Ito, 1965

Type species
- Decollidrillia nigra Habe & Ito, 1965

Genus of gastropods

Decollidrillia is a genus of sea snails, marine gastropod mollusks in the family Turridae, the turrids.

== Species ==
Species within the genus Decollidrillia include:

- Decollidrillia nigra Habe & Ito, 1965
