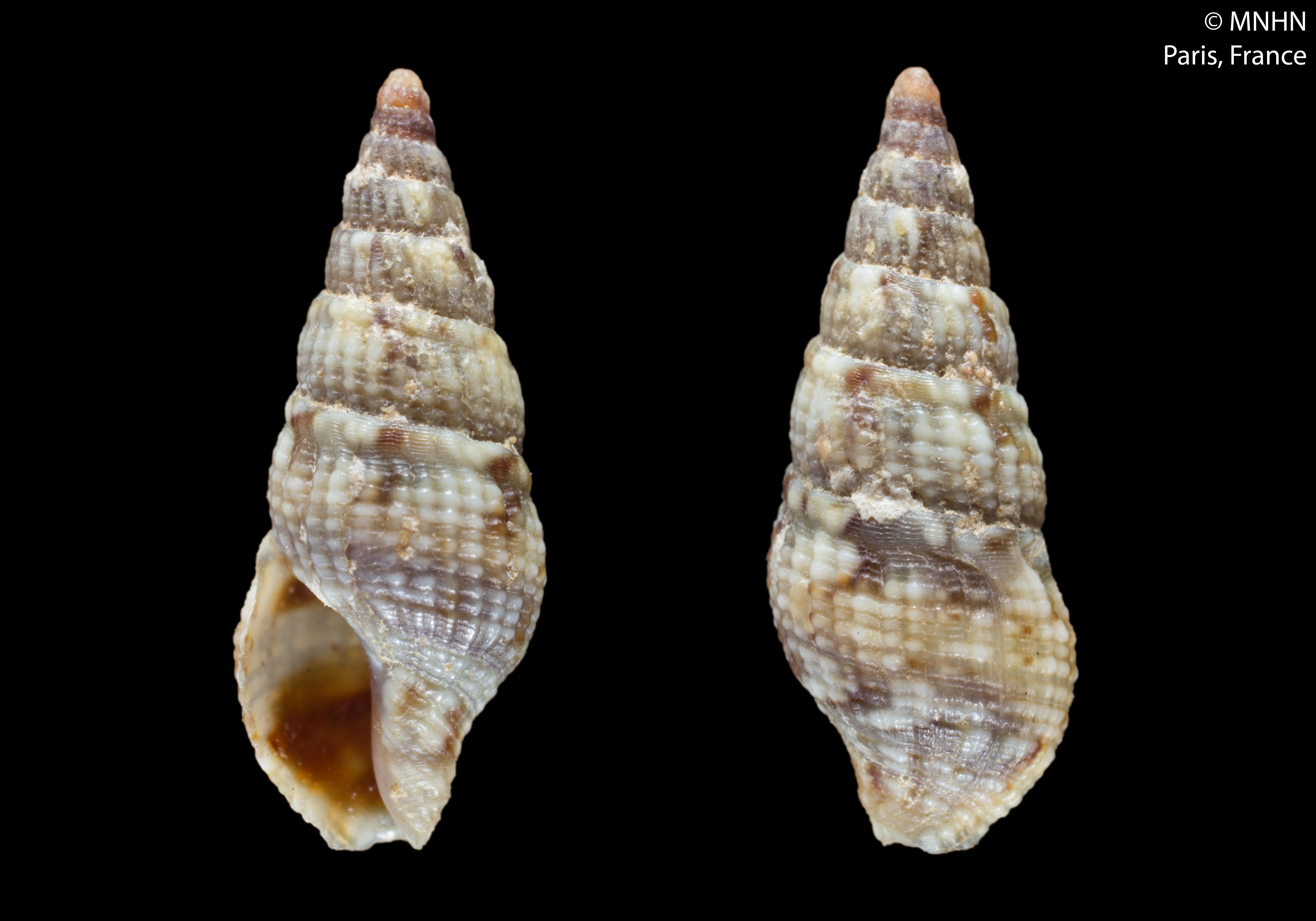
- Scaevatula pellisserpentis

Scientific classification
- Kingdom: Animalia
- Phylum: Mollusca
- Class: Gastropoda
- Subclass: Caenogastropoda
- Order: Neogastropoda
- Superfamily: Conoidea
- Family: Clavatulidae
- Genus: Scaevatula; Gofas, 1990

Type species
- Scaevatula pellisserpentis Gofas, 1990

= Scaevatula =

Genus of gastropods

Scaevatula is a genus of small predatory sea snails, marine gastropod mollusks in the family Clavatulidae.

Most gastropod species, and especially the marine species, have a dextral shell. The genus Scaevatula represents an exception to this rule, as the species are sinister. Within the family Clavatulidae, the extinct species Clavatula aralica (Luković, 1924) is the only other exception.

== Species ==
Species within the genus Scaevatula include:

- Scaevatula amancioi Rolan & Fernandes, 1992
- Scaevatula pellisserpentis Gofas, 1990
- † Scaevatula sidoniae (Hoernes & Auinger, 1891)
