= Benthoclionella =

Scientific classification
- Kingdom: Animalia
- Phylum: Mollusca
- Class: Gastropoda
- Subclass: Caenogastropoda
- Order: Neogastropoda
- Superfamily: Conoidea
- Family: Clavatulidae
- Genus: Benthoclionella; Kilburn, 1974

Genus of gastropods

Benthoclionella is a genus of sea snails, marine gastropod mollusks in the family Clavatulidae.

== Species ==
Species within the genus Benthoclionella include:

- Benthoclionella jenneri Kilburn, 1974
