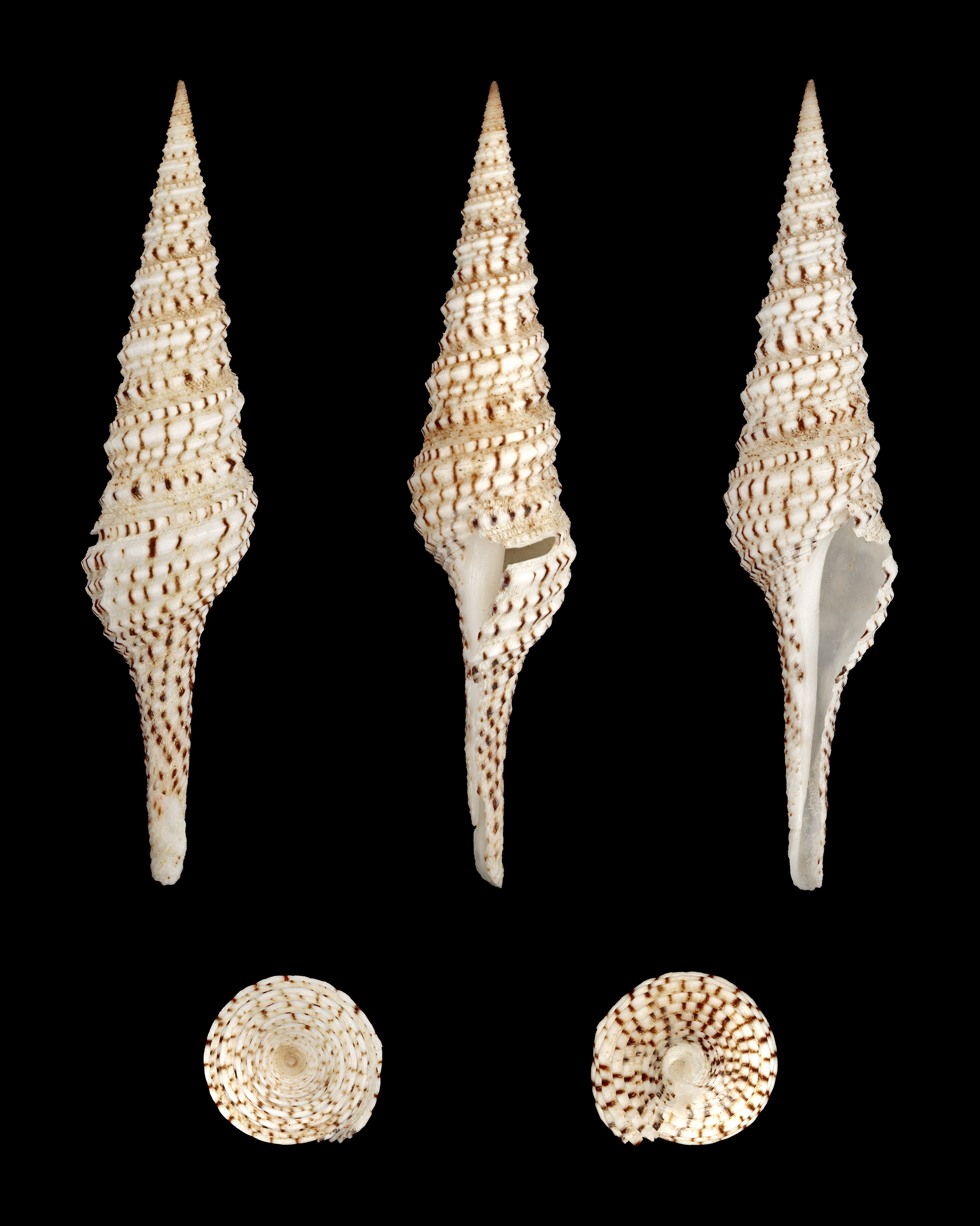
- Turris crispa crispa

Scientific classification
- Kingdom: Animalia
- Phylum: Mollusca
- Class: Gastropoda
- Subclass: Caenogastropoda
- Order: Neogastropoda
- Family: Turridae
- Genus: Turris
- Species: T. crispa

Binomial name
- Turris crispa (Lamarck, 1816)

Synonyms
- Pleurotoma crispa Lamarck, 1816; Pleurotoma gracillima Weinkauff, H.C. & W. Kobelt, 1875; Turris dollyae Olivera, 1999

= Turris crispa =

Species of gastropod

Turris crispa is a species of sea snail, a marine gastropod mollusk in the family Turridae, the turrids.

The subspecies Turris crispa intricata Powell, 1964 is a synonym of Turris intricata Powell, 1964 (original combination)

== Description ==
The size of an adult shell varies between 60 mm and 170 mm.

== Distribution ==
This marine species occurs off Madagascar, Australia, Japan, the Philippines and the Fiji Islands.
