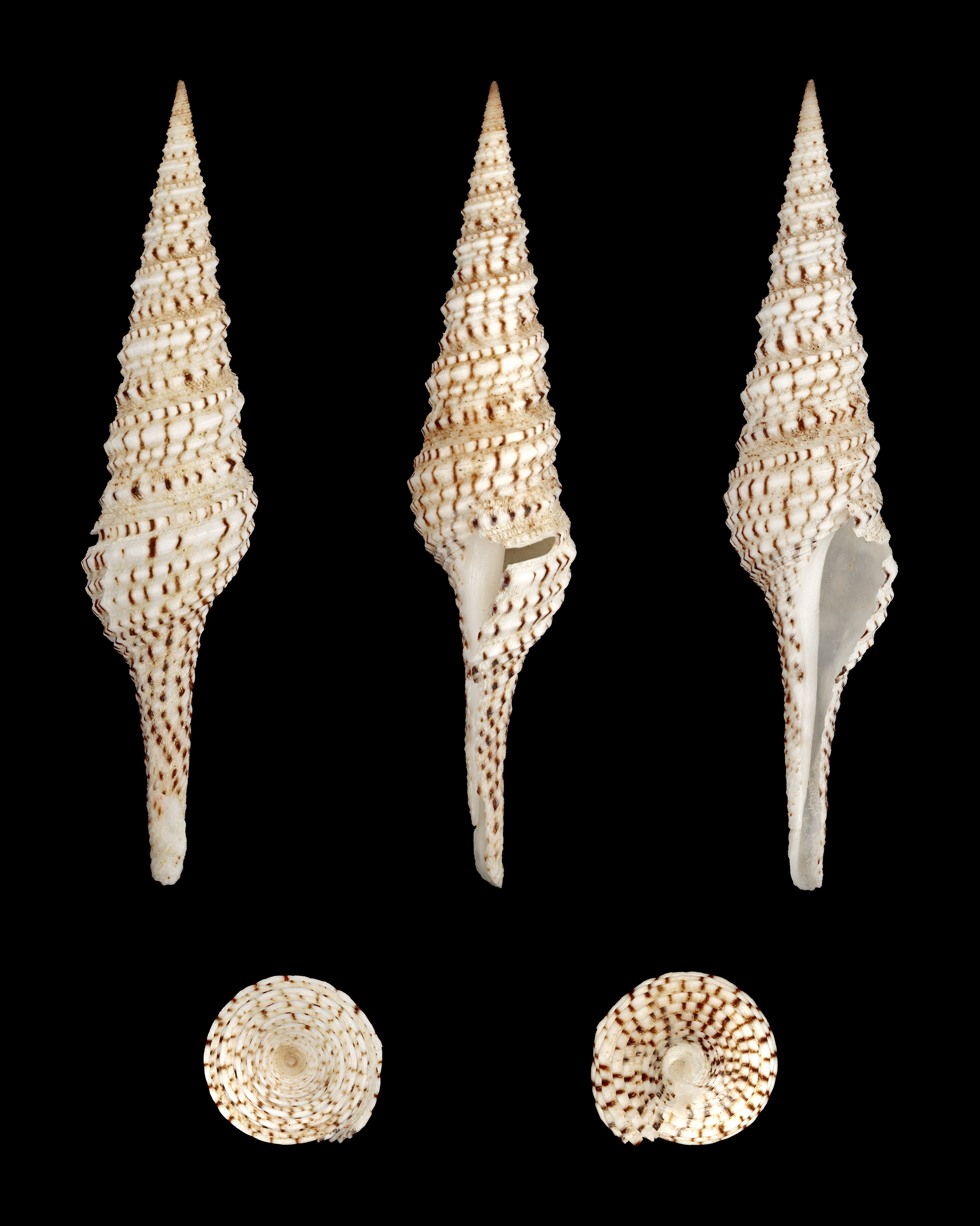
- Five views of a shell of Turris crispa

Scientific classification
- Kingdom: Animalia
- Phylum: Mollusca
- Class: Gastropoda
- Subclass: Caenogastropoda
- Order: Neogastropoda
- Superfamily: Conoidea
- Family: Turridae; H. Adams & A. Adams, 1853 (1838)

Type genus
- Turris Batch, 1789

Genera
- See text

Synonyms
- Pleurotomidae

= Turridae =

Family of gastropods

Turridae is a taxonomic family name for a number of predatory sea snails, marine gastropod mollusks in the superfamily Conoidea.

The family name Turridae was originally given to a very large group of several thousand sea snail species that were thought to be closely related. The family was described with about 700 genus-group taxa and an estimated 10,000 recent and fossil species. However, that original grouping was discovered to be polyphyletic.

In recent years, the family Turridae has been much reduced in size, because a number of other families were created to contain the monophyletic lineages that had previously been thought to belong in the same family.

The common name turrids is still used informally to refer to the polyphyletic group.

== Distribution ==
Species in the family Turridae are found worldwide; most are found in the neritic zone. It is a major component of the Indo-Pacific molluscan fauna.

== Shell description ==
The shape of the narrow shells is more or less fusiform. The whorls are elongate to broadly spindle-shaped and conical. The shells are generally small, their length usually smaller than 150 mm (with a few exceptions, up to 250 mm). The sculpture is variable. The shell shows strong ribs and spiral ridges. The aperture is long and narrow, with a siphonal canal and an anal sinus.

Turrids are carnivorous, predatory gastropods. Most species have a poison gland used with the toxoglossan radula, used to prey on vertebrates and invertebrate animals (mostly polychaete worms) or in self-defense. Some turrids have lost the radula and the poison gland. The radula, when present, has two or three teeth in a row. It lacks lateral teeth and the marginal teeth are of the wishbone or duplex type. The teeth with a duplex form are not shaped from two distinct elements but grow from a flat plate, by thickening at the edges of the teeth and elevation of the rear edge from the membrane.

Female turrids lay their eggs in lens-shaped capsules.

== History of the taxonomy ==
The family Turridae, in the older broadest sense of the group, was in the past perceived as one of the most difficult groups to study because of a large number of supra-specific described taxa, which were complicated by their species diversity.

This led to an outcry by Melvill & Standen in 1901:

One cannot help feeling, indeed, the more the Pleurotomacea (now former name for the Pleurotomidae, synonym of Turridae) are studied closely, how painfully artificial and misleading are many of the characters which are employed in differentiating the sections, so called genera, and subgenera of this vast assemblage. It is almost too large for the monographer, and so enormous are the number of species annually brought to light, especially since the abyssal forms have been sought after and procured with greater facility, that we fear confusion will soon be worse confounded, and the patience of malacologists tried too far, unless some benefactor of this race arises to study these forms alone as his life's work.

Although some species were relatively common, many were rare, some being known only from single specimens; this is another factor that made studying the group difficult. Turridiae was in this sense a heterogenous family that contained, more or less, all conoideans not included in the Conidae and Terebridae. Most of this was based on radula and shell characters. Taylor et al. (1993) tried to rely more on anatomical characters and moved several subfamilies from Turridae to Conidae.

2005 taxonomy

According to the taxonomy of the Gastropoda by Bouchet & Rocroi, 2005, which attempted to set out a stable taxonomy, this family consisted of the following five subfamilies:

- Turrinae H. Adams & A. Adams, 1853 (1838) - synonyms: Pleurotominae Gray, 1838; Lophiotominae Morrison, 1965 (n.a.)
- Cochlespirinae Powell, 1942
- Crassispirinae McLean, 1971 - synonym: Belinae A. Bellardi, 1875
- Zemaciinae Sysoev, 2003
- Zonulispirinae McLean, 1971

2011 taxonomy

The 2005 classification system for the group was greatly changed by the 2011 publication of an article revising the taxonomy of the superfamily Conoidea, The authors presented a new classification of the superfamily Conoidea on the genus level, based on anatomical characters but also on the molecular phylogeny as presented by Puillandre N., et al., 2008. The polyphyletic family Turridae was resolved into 13 monophyletic families (containing 358 currently recognized genera and subgenera)

- Conorbidae
- Borsoniidae
- Clathurellidae
- Mitromorphidae
- Mangeliidae
- Raphitomidae
- Cochlespiridae
- Drilliidae
- Pseudomelatomidae (= Crassispiridae)
- Clavatulidae
- Horaiclavidae
- Turridae s.s.
- Strictispiridae - synonym of Pseudomelatomidae Morrison, 1966

2024 taxonomy

The family was redescribed again with a generic revision in 2024 by Kantor, Y., Bouchet, P., Fedosov, A., Puillandre, N. & Zaharias, P, containing now 252 species.

== Current genera ==
Genera in the family Turridae sensu stricto, include according to WoRMS:

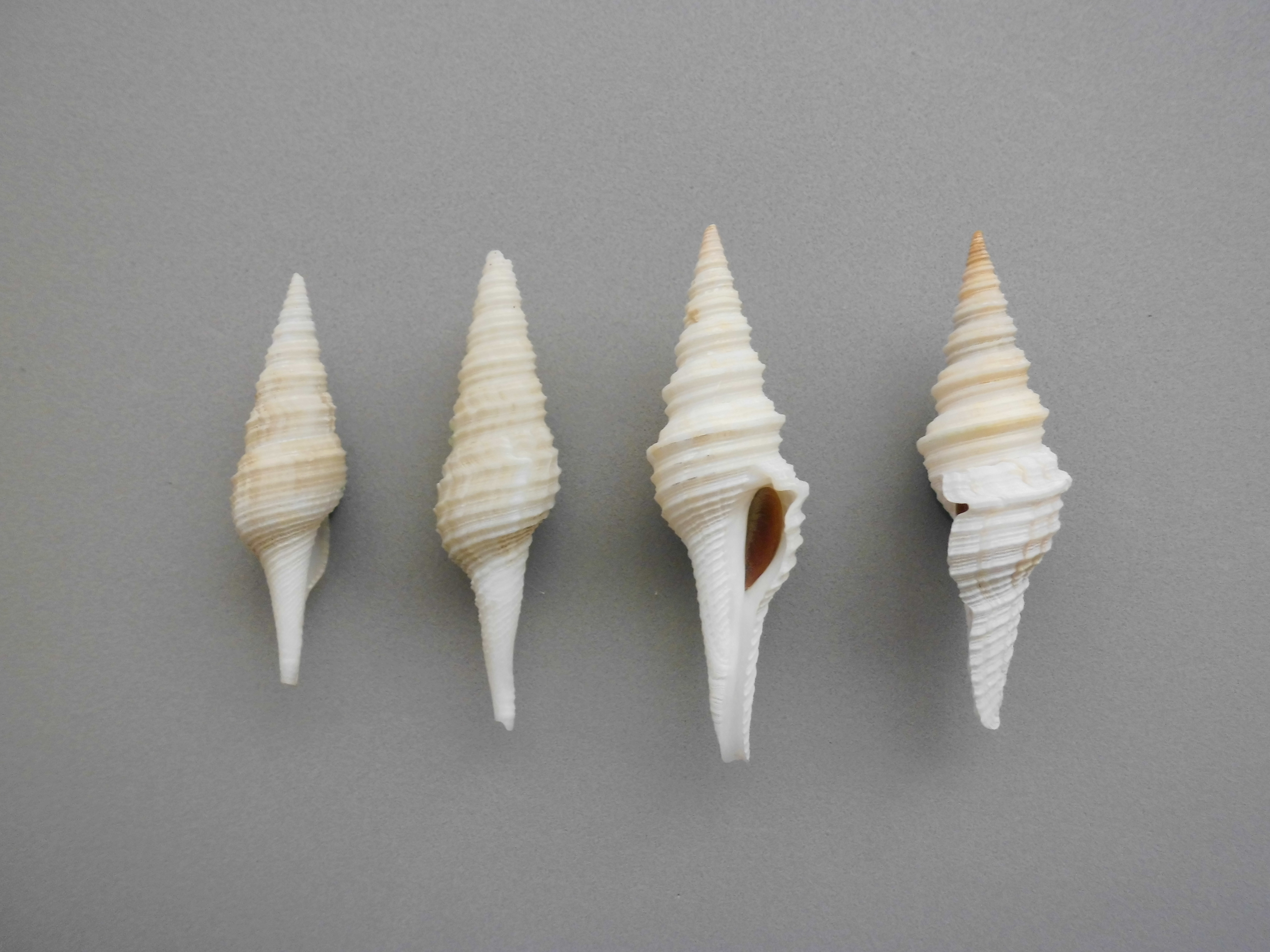
Polystira albida

- Alisigemmula Kantor, Bouchet, Fedosov, Puillandre & Zaharias, 2024
- Anisogemmula Kantor, Bouchet, Fedosov, Puillandre & Zaharias, 2024
- Annulaturris A. W. B. Powell, 1966
- † Clavogemmula D. C. Long, 1981
- † Coronia de Gregorio, 1890
- † Coroniopsis MacNeil, 1984
- Cryptogemma Dall, 1918
- Deceptigemmula Kantor, Bouchet, Fedosov, Puillandre & Zaharias, 2024
- † Daphnobela Cossmann, 1896
- Decollidrillia Habe & Ito, 1965
- † Epalxis Cossmann, 1889
- Epidirella Iredale, 1913: belongs to the family Pseudomelatomidae
- Eugemmula Iredale, 1931
- Gemmula Weinkauff, 1875
- Gemmuloborsonia Shuto, 1989
- † Gemmulopsis Tracey & Craig, 2019
- Iotyrris Medinskaya & Sysoev, 2001: synonym of Xenuroturris Iredale, 1929
- Kilburnigemmula Kantor, Bouchet, Fedosov, Puillandre & Zaharias, 2024
- Kuroshioturris Shuto, 1961
- Lophiotoma Casey, 1904
- Lucerapex Iredale, 1936
- Mcleanigemmula Kantor, Bouchet, Fedosov, Puillandre & Zaharias, 2024
- † Nasavusavuia Ladd, 1982
- Oliveragemmula Kantor, Bouchet, Fedosov, Puillandre & Zaharias, 2024
- † Pleuroliria De Gregorio, 1890
- Polystira Woodring, 1928
- Powelligemmula Kantor, Bouchet, Fedosov, Puillandre & Zaharias, 2024
- Pseudogemmula Kantor, Bouchet, Fedosov, Puillandre & Zaharias, 2024
- Purpuraturris K. Chase, Watkins, Safavi-Hemami & B. M. Olivera, 2022: synonym of Annulaturris A. W. B. Powell, 1966 (junior subjective synonym
- † Pyrenoturris Eames, 1952
- Shutogemmula Kantor, Bouchet, Fedosov, Puillandre & Zaharias, 2024
- Taylorigemmula Kantor, Bouchet, Fedosov, Puillandre & Zaharias, 2024
- Thielesyrinx Kantor, Bouchet, Fedosov, Puillandre & Zaharias, 2024
- Turridrupa Hedley, 1922
- Turris Röding, 1798 - type genus
- Unedogemmula MacNeil, 1961
- Xenuroturris Iredale, 1929

Synonymy

- Annulaturris Powell, 1966: synonym of Turris Batsch, 1789
- Austrogemmula Laseron, 1954: synonym of Epidirella Iredale, 1913
- Bathybermudia Haas, 1949: synonym of Ptychosyrinx Thiele, 1925
- Clamturris Iredale, 1931: synonym of Xenuroturris Iredale, 1929
- Eugemmula Iredale, 1931: synonym of Gemmula Weinkauff, 1875
- Euryentmena : synonym of Euryentmema Woodring, 1928 (misspelling)
- Lophioturris Powell, 1964: synonym of Lophiotoma Casey, 1904
- Oxytropa Glibert, 1955: synonym of Polystira Woodring, 1928
- Pinguigemmula McNeil, 1961: synonym of Cryptogemma Dall, 1918
- Pleurotoma Lamarck, 1799: synonym of Turris Batsch, 1789
- Ptychosyrinx Thiele, 1925: synonym of Cryptogemma Dall, 1918

Subfamily Strictispirinae McLean, 1971 : synonym of Strictispiridae McLean, 1971, synonym of Pseudomelatomidae Morrison, 1966 (raised to family level)
