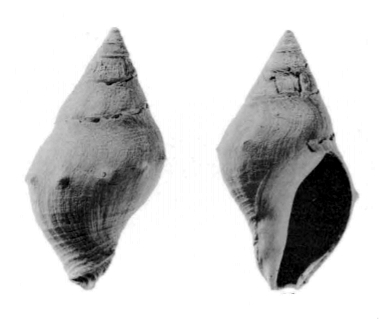

Scientific classification
- Kingdom: Animalia
- Phylum: Mollusca
- Class: Gastropoda
- Subclass: Caenogastropoda
- Order: Neogastropoda
- Superfamily: Conoidea
- Family: Pseudomelatomidae
- Genus: Megasurcula
- Species: †M. howei

Binomial name
- †Megasurcula howei Hanna and Hertlein, 1938

Synonyms
- †Megasurcula etheringtoni Weaver, 1943; †Megasurcula keepi (Arnold) Grant and Gale, 1931

= Megasurcula howei =

Extinct species of gastropod

Megasurcula howei is an extinct species of sea snail, a marine gastropod mollusk in the family Pseudomelatomidae, the turrids and allies.

== Description ==
The length of the shell attains 36 mm, its diameter 23.6 mm.

This high-spired, biconic species differs from Megasurcula condonana (Anderson and Martin, 1914) by having a smoothly conic spire and relatively narrower body whorl. When the body whorl angulation is used as a point of reference, in non-apertural view, the upper cone of M. howei is relatively higher than the lower cone, whereas the reverse is true in specimens of the stout-shelled M. condonana. Further differences are the more acute sutural angle and the concave profile of M. condonana.

It is closely related to † Megasurcula guayasensis of the Miocene in Ecuador, but differs by being less slender, a bit taller and less finely noded.

== Distribution ==
Fossils of this marine species have been found in Miocene strata of the Temblor Formation, California.
