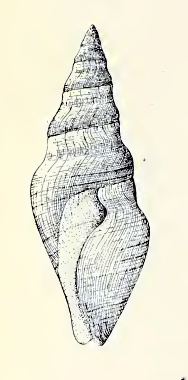
- Shell of Megasurcula tremperiana

Scientific classification
- Kingdom: Animalia
- Phylum: Mollusca
- Class: Gastropoda
- Subclass: Caenogastropoda
- Order: Neogastropoda
- Superfamily: Conoidea
- Family: Pseudomelatomidae
- Genus: Megasurcula
- Species: M. tremperiana

Binomial name
- Megasurcula tremperiana (W. H. Dall, 1911)

Synonyms
- Bathytoma tremperiana (Dall, 1911); Cryptoconus tremperianus Dall, 1911

= Megasurcula tremperiana =

Species of gastropod

Megasurcula tremperiana is a species of sea snail, a marine gastropod mollusk in the family Pseudomelatomidae, the turrids and allies.

== Taxonomy ==
There is some confusion about the accepted name for this species. The website Gastropods.com considers this species a synonym of Mangelia carpenteri (Folin, L. de, 1867) It was also considered a synonym of Bathytoma tremperiana (Dall, 1911), itself considered by W.H. Dall a synonym of Cryptoconus tremperianus Dall, 1911. But then WoRMS considers this last name a synonym of Megasurcula carpenteriana (Gabb, 1865)

== Description ==
The length of the shell attains 60 mm.

== Distribution ==
This marine species occurs off California.
