= Benthodaphne =

Scientific classification
- Kingdom: Animalia
- Phylum: Mollusca
- Class: Gastropoda
- Subclass: Caenogastropoda
- Order: Neogastropoda
- Superfamily: Conoidea
- Family: Pseudomelatomidae
- Genus: Benthodaphne; Oyama, 1962

Type species
- Pleurotama (Bela ?) glabra Yokoyama, 1920

Species
- See text

Genus of gastropods

Benthodaphne is a genus of sea snails, marine gastropod mollusks in the family Pseudomelatomidae,.

== Description ==
The shell is rather small and resembles Antiplanes or Spirotropis, except for the growth lines. The rather flat whorls are smooth save fine growth lines such as in Daphnella.

== Distribution ==
This marine genus is found off Japan.

== Species ==
- Benthodaphne yukiae (Shikama, 1962) (considered provisionally as a synonym of Antiplanes yukiae)
