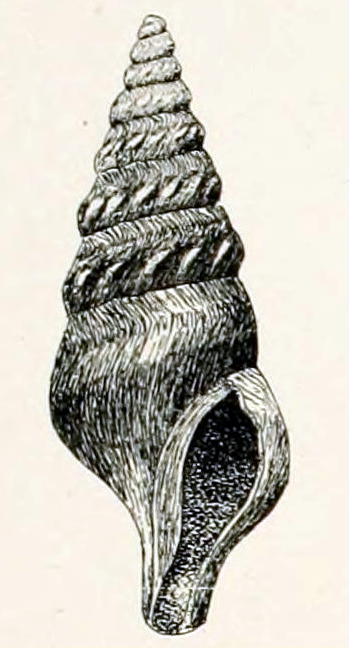
- Original image of a shell of Rhodopetoma renaudi

Scientific classification
- Kingdom: Animalia
- Phylum: Mollusca
- Class: Gastropoda
- Subclass: Caenogastropoda
- Order: Neogastropoda
- Superfamily: Conoidea
- Family: Pseudomelatomidae
- Genus: Rhodopetoma
- Species: R. renaudi

Binomial name
- Rhodopetoma renaudi (Arnold, 1903)

Synonyms
- Drillia renaudi Arnold, 1903

= Rhodopetoma renaudi =

Species of gastropod

Rhodopetoma renaudi is a species of sea snail, a marine gastropod mollusk in the family Pseudomelatomidae.

== Description ==
The length of the shell attains 15.8 mm, its diameter 6 mm.

(Original description) The small shell is fusiform and turreted. The apex is blunt. The shell contains eight whorls. These are sharply angular, with an angle about two-fifths distance from the anterior margin of the whorl. The upper and lower surfaces are flat. About fifteen oblique nodes ornament the angle and extend down on the lower portion of the whorl, becoming obsolete before reaching the suture. The nodes become obsolete on the body whorl. The suture is profoundly impressed and distinct. The aperture is short, elliptical and oblique. The posterior sinus is broad and shallow. The anterior sinus is long and straight. The columella is incrusted within. The body whorl is angular, ventricose, much produced and narrow below, smooth, except for faint incremental lines.

The species is distinguishable by the smooth, ventricose body whorl, sharply angulated whorls, nodose angle, and a long siphonal canal.

== Distribution ==
This rare species occurs off California, United States. One specimen has been found from Pliocene strata and one (type) from lower San Pedro series of Deadman Island.
