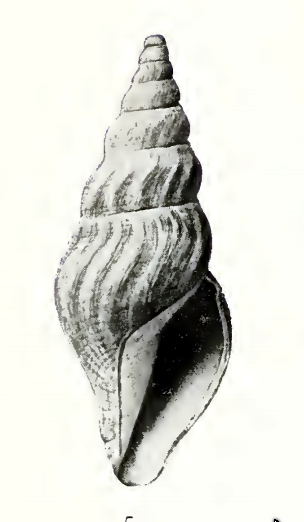
- Original image of a shell of Antiplanes abarbarea

Scientific classification
- Kingdom: Animalia
- Phylum: Mollusca
- Class: Gastropoda
- Subclass: Caenogastropoda
- Order: Neogastropoda
- Superfamily: Conoidea
- Family: Pseudomelatomidae
- Genus: Antiplanes
- Species: A. abarbarea

Binomial name
- Antiplanes abarbarea Dall, 1919

Synonyms
- Spirotropis (Borsonella) abarbarea (Dall, 1919)

= Antiplanes abarbarea =

Species of gastropod

Antiplanes abarbarea is a species of sea snail, a marine gastropod mollusk in the family Pseudomelatomidae,.

== Description ==
The length of the shell attains 21.5 mm, its diameter 8 mm.

(Original description) The whitish, acute shell has one globular protoconch and 6½ subsequent, well-rounded whorls. The suture is distinct, not appressed. The spiral sculpture consists of faint obscure grooves with wider interspaces over the whole spire but obsolete on the body whorl, and a series of faint irregular peripheral nodulosities on the upper part of the spire. The axial sculpture consists of rather coarse, irregular incremental lines, retractively arcuate in front of the suture, though there is no distinct fasciole. The aperture is elongate. The anal sulcus is close to the suture and is rather deep. The outer lip is thin and smooth inside. The inner lip is erased. The columella is straight, smooth and attenuated in front. The siphonal canal is short, wide and nearly straight.

== Distribution ==
The holotype was found off Santa Rosa Island, California, United States.
