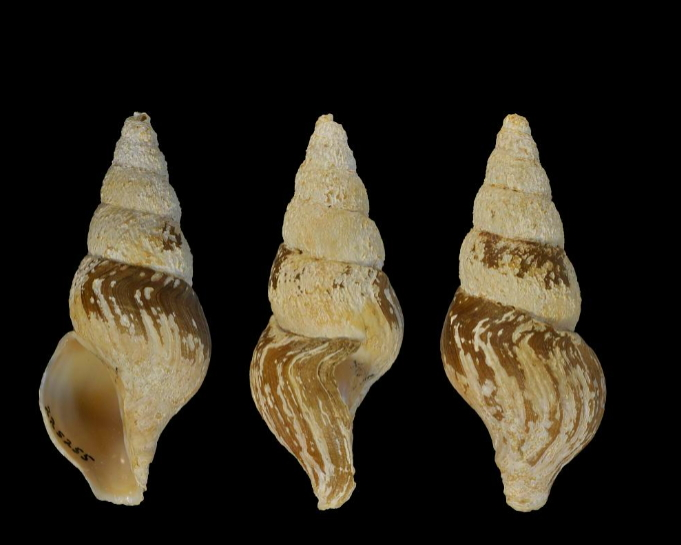
- Shell of Antiplanes vinosa (holotype at the Smithsonian Institution)

Scientific classification
- Kingdom: Animalia
- Phylum: Mollusca
- Class: Gastropoda
- Subclass: Caenogastropoda
- Order: Neogastropoda
- Superfamily: Conoidea
- Family: Pseudomelatomidae
- Genus: Antiplanes
- Species: A. vinosa

Binomial name
- Antiplanes vinosa (Dall, 1874)

Synonyms
- Antiplanes contraria (Yokoyama, 1926); Antiplanes kamchatica Dall, 1919; † Pleurotoma contraria Yokoyama, 1926; Pleurotoma vinosa Dall, 1874; Pleurotoma (Antiplanes) vinosa Dall, 1874

= Antiplanes vinosa =

Species of mollusc

Antiplanes vinosa, common name the left-handed turrid, is a species of sea snail, a marine gastropod mollusk in the family Pseudomelatomidae.

== Description ==
The length of this sinistral shell attains 30 mm.

== Distribution ==
This marine species occurs off the Aleutians and Northern Japan.
