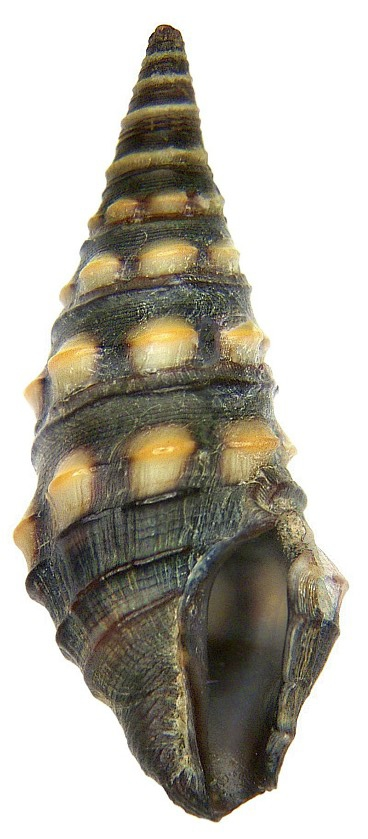
- Shell

Scientific classification
- Kingdom: Animalia
- Phylum: Mollusca
- Class: Gastropoda
- Subclass: Caenogastropoda
- Order: Neogastropoda
- Superfamily: Conoidea
- Family: Pseudomelatomidae
- Genus: Zonulispira
- Species: Z. grandimaculata

Binomial name
- Zonulispira grandimaculata (Adams C. B., 1852)

Synonyms
- Crassispira dirce Dall, 1919; Crassispira reigeni Bartsch, 1950; Pleurotoma grandimaculata Adams C. B., 1852; Zonulispira dirce Dall, 1919

= Zonulispira grandimaculata =

Species of gastropod

Zonulispira grandimaculata is a species of sea snail, a marine gastropod mollusk in the family Pseudomelatomidae, the turrids and allies.

== Description ==
The length of the shell varies between 10 mm and 24 mm.

== Distribution ==
This species occurs in the Pacific Ocean between Nicaragua and Panama.
