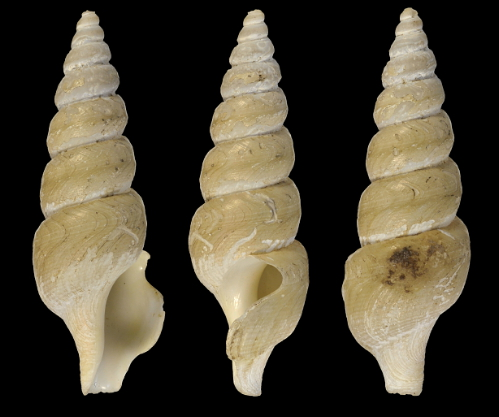

Scientific classification
- Kingdom: Animalia
- Phylum: Mollusca
- Class: Gastropoda
- Subclass: Caenogastropoda
- Order: Neogastropoda
- Superfamily: Conoidea
- Family: Pseudomelatomidae
- Genus: Antiplanes
- Species: A. thalaea

Binomial name
- Antiplanes thalaea (Dall, 1902)

Synonyms
- Antiplanes (Rectiplanes) willetti Berry, 1953; Antiplanes rotula Dall, 1921; Antiplanes santarosana (Dall, 1902); Pleurotoma (Antiplanes) thalaea Dall, 1902 (basionym); Pleurotoma (Spirotropis) smithi Arnold, 1903 (invalid: junior homonym of Pleurotoma smithii Forbes, 1840; Antiplanes rotula is a replacement name); Pleurotoma santarosana Dall, 1902; Pleurotoma thalaea Dall, 1902

= Antiplanes thalaea =

Species of gastropod

Antiplanes thalaea is a species of sea snail, a marine gastropod mollusk in the family Pseudomelatomidae,.

== Description ==
The length of the shell attains 40 mm, its diameter 12 mm.

(Original description) The solid, heavy shell has an elongate spire constricted at the sutures, and eight or more whorls. The protoconch is eroded. The surface is covered with a pale apple green periostracum, which fades in time to a greenish gray. The surface is sculptured only by incremental lines, faint spiral lines, a slight depression of the anal fasciole, and irregular, feeble, broken, short elevated lines which are scattered over the surface and usually directed at right angles to the incremental lines. The aperture is short and narrow, with a short and wide siphonal canal. The outer lip shows a deep anal sinuosity, leaving a slightly depressed fasciole behind it. The anterior part of the outer lip is much produced and rounded, thin and simple. The columella is stout, white, short, obliquely truncate in front. The siphonal canal is wide, short, slightly flaring. The base of the shell is somewhat constricted, with the spiral striae stronger than on the rest of the surface.

== Distribution ==
This marine species occurs off California, United States.
