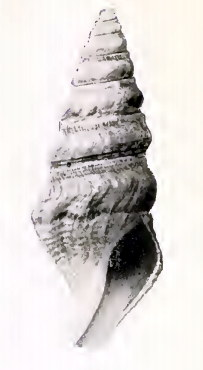
- Shell of Rhodopetoma diaulax

Scientific classification
- Kingdom: Animalia
- Phylum: Mollusca
- Class: Gastropoda
- Subclass: Caenogastropoda
- Order: Neogastropoda
- Superfamily: Conoidea
- Family: Pseudomelatomidae
- Genus: Rhodopetoma; Bartsch, 1944

Type species
- Borsonella rhodope Dall, 1919

Species
- See text

= Rhodopetoma =

Genus of gastropods

Rhodopetoma is a genus of sea snails, marine gastropod mollusks in the family Pseudomelatomidae.

Rhodopetoma is very similar to Antiplanes, differing mainly in the presence of variously developed axial folds.

== Species ==
Species within the genus Rhodopetoma include:

- Rhodopetoma amycus (Dall, 1919)
- Rhodopetoma diaulax (Dall, 1908)
- Rhodopetoma erosa (Schrenck, 1862)
- Rhodopetoma renaudi (Arnold, 1903)

Species brought into synonymy

- Rhodopetoma akkeshiensis Habe, 1958: synonym of Ophiodermella akkeshiensis (Habe, 1958)
- Rhodopetoma rhodope (Dall, 1919): synonym of Rhodopetoma diaulax (Dall, 1908)
