= Megasurcula yokoyamai =

Scientific classification
- Kingdom: Animalia
- Phylum: Mollusca
- Class: Gastropoda
- Subclass: Caenogastropoda
- Order: Neogastropoda
- Superfamily: Conoidea
- Family: Pseudomelatomidae
- Genus: Megasurcula
- Species: †M. yokoyamai

Binomial name
- †Megasurcula yokoyamai (Otuka, 1934)

Synonyms
- †Surculites yokoyamai Otuka, 1934

Extinct species of gastropod

Megasurcula yokoyamai is an extinct species of sea snail, a marine gastropod mollusk in the family Pseudomelatomidae, the turrids and allies.

== Distribution ==
Fossils of this marine species have been found in Middle Miocene strata in Japan.
