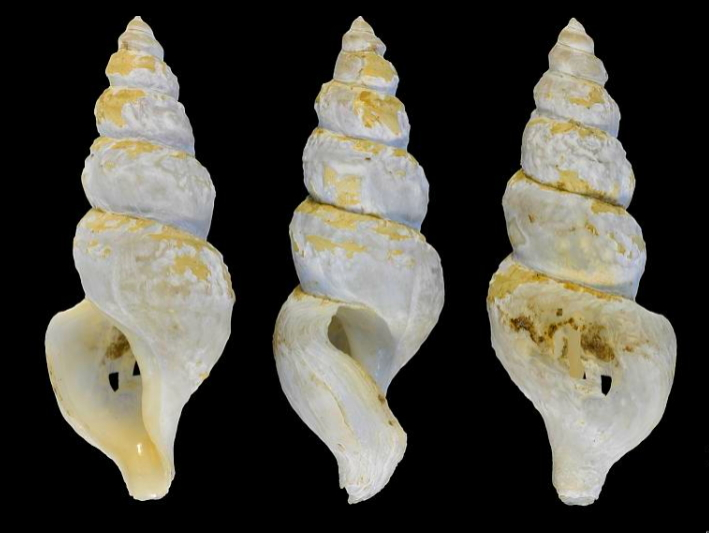
- Shell of Antiplanes bulimoides (holotype at the Smithsonian Institution)

Scientific classification
- Kingdom: Animalia
- Phylum: Mollusca
- Class: Gastropoda
- Subclass: Caenogastropoda
- Order: Neogastropoda
- Superfamily: Conoidea
- Family: Pseudomelatomidae
- Genus: Antiplanes
- Species: A. bulimoides

Binomial name
- Antiplanes bulimoides Dall, 1919

= Antiplanes bulimoides =

Species of gastropod

Antiplanes bulimoides is a species of sea snail, a marine gastropod mollusk in the family Pseudomelatomidae.

== Description ==
The length of the shell is 31 mm, its diameter 15 mm.

(Original description) The elongate shell is decollate. It contains six or more whorls, four distinctly remaining in the holotype. The suture is distinct and not appressed. The whorls are moderately convex, smooth, with a pale polished greenish periostracum over a white substratum, in spots minutely granulose, apparently from some wrinkling of the periostracum. The anal sulcus is wide, shallow, hardly forming a fasciole. The outer lip is thin, sharp and moderately produced. The inner lip shows a thin white layer of callus. The columella is straight, with an anterior oblique attenuation. The siphonal canal is wide and hardly differentiated.

== Distribution ==
The holotype was found off the Bowers Bank in the Bering Sea.
