= Cretaspira cretacea =

Scientific classification
- Kingdom: Animalia
- Phylum: Mollusca
- Class: Gastropoda
- Subclass: Caenogastropoda
- Order: Neogastropoda
- Superfamily: Conoidea
- Family: Pseudomelatomidae
- Genus: Cretaspira
- Species: C. cretacea

Binomial name
- Cretaspira cretacea Kuroda & Oyama, 1971

Species of gastropod

Cretaspira cretacea is a species of sea snail, a marine gastropod mollusk in the family Pseudomelatomidae, the turrids and allies.

== Distribution ==
This marine species occurs off Japan.
