= Boreocomitas oregonensis =

Scientific classification
- Kingdom: Animalia
- Phylum: Mollusca
- Class: Gastropoda
- Subclass: Caenogastropoda
- Order: Neogastropoda
- Family: Pseudomelatomidae
- Genus: †Boreocomitas
- Species: †B. oregonensis

Binomial name
- †Boreocomitas oregonensis (Hickman, 1976)

Synonyms
- † Comitas (Boreocomitas) oregonensis Hickman, 1976 (basionym)

Species of gastropod

Boreocomitas oregonensis is an extinct species of sea snail, a marine gastropod mollusc in the family Pseudomelatomidae.

== Distribution ==
Fossils of this marine species were found in Oligocene strata in Oregon, United States.
