= Antiplanes isaotakii =

Scientific classification
- Kingdom: Animalia
- Phylum: Mollusca
- Class: Gastropoda
- Subclass: Caenogastropoda
- Order: Neogastropoda
- Superfamily: Conoidea
- Family: Pseudomelatomidae
- Genus: Antiplanes
- Species: A. isaotakii

Binomial name
- Antiplanes isaotakii (Habe, 1958)

Synonyms
- Rectiplanes isaotakii Habe, 1958

Species of gastropod

Antiplanes isaotakii is a species of sea snail, a marine gastropod mollusk in the family Pseudomelatomidae.

== Distribution ==
This marine species occurs off Japan.
