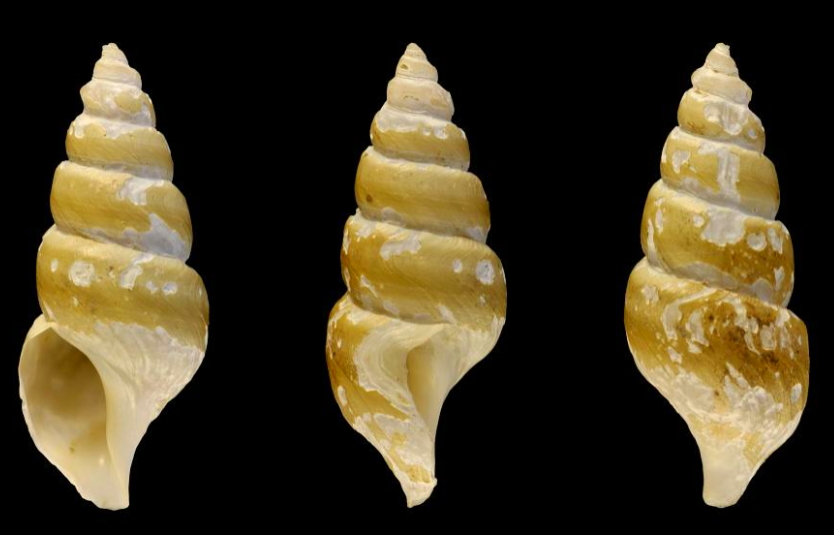
- Shell of Antiplanes profundicola (holotype at the Smithsonian Institution)

Scientific classification
- Kingdom: Animalia
- Phylum: Mollusca
- Class: Gastropoda
- Subclass: Caenogastropoda
- Order: Neogastropoda
- Superfamily: Conoidea
- Family: Pseudomelatomidae
- Genus: Antiplanes
- Species: A. profundicola

Binomial name
- Antiplanes profundicola Bartsch, 1944

Synonyms
- Antiplanes diomedia [sic] (misspelling)

= Antiplanes profundicola =

Species of gastropod

Antiplanes profundicola is a species of sea snail, a marine gastropod mollusk in the family Pseudomelatomidae.

== Description ==
The length of the shell attains 30 mm, its diameter 10.4 mm.

== Distribution ==
This marine species occurs from the Arctic Ocean to California, United States.
