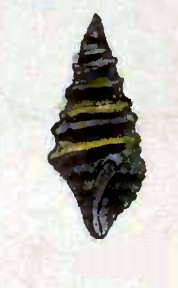
- Shell

Scientific classification
- Kingdom: Animalia
- Phylum: Mollusca
- Class: Gastropoda
- Subclass: Caenogastropoda
- Order: Neogastropoda
- Superfamily: Conoidea
- Family: Pseudomelatomidae
- Genus: Zonulispira
- Species: Z. zonulata

Binomial name
- Zonulispira zonulata (Reeve, 1842)

Synonyms
- Drillia zonulata (Reeve, 1842); Pleurotoma cincta Sowerby, G.B. I, 1834; Pleurotoma zonulata Reeve, 1842

= Zonulispira zonulata =

Species of gastropod

Zonulispira zonulata is a species of sea snail, a marine gastropod mollusk in the family Pseudomelatomidae.

== Description ==
The length of the shell varies between 13 mm and 20 mm.

== Distribution ==
This marine species occurs between Pacific Ocean, Colombia and Panama.
