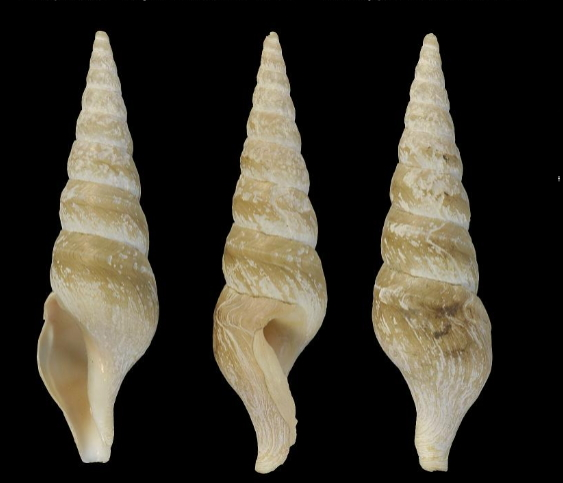
- Shell of Antiplanes catalinae

Scientific classification
- Kingdom: Animalia
- Phylum: Mollusca
- Class: Gastropoda
- Subclass: Caenogastropoda
- Order: Neogastropoda
- Superfamily: Conoidea
- Family: Pseudomelatomidae
- Genus: Antiplanes (Dall, 1902)

Type species
- Surcula perversa Gabb, 1865

Species
- See text

Synonyms
- Antiplanes (Rectiplanes) Bartsch, 1944; Pleurotoma (Antiplanes) Dall, 1902 (original description); Rectiplanes Bartsch, 1944; Rectiplanes (Rectisulcus) Habe, 1958; Rectisulcus Habe, 1958; Turris (Antiplanes) Dall, 1902 (unaccepted combination)

= Antiplanes =

Genus of gastropods

Antiplanes is a genus of sea snails, marine gastropod mollusks in the family Pseudomelatomidae.

== Description ==
(Original description) These deep-water and abyssal forms are smooth except for incremental lines and sometimes fine spiral striae. The periostracum is conspicuous and the shell disposed to be chalky. The anal sulcus is shallow and more or less rounded, usually situated some distance from the suture, but not quite on the periphery of the whorl. The siphonal canal is rather wide and long and often a little recurved. The aperture is unarmed. There are both dextral and sinistral species.

== Species ==
Species within the genus Antiplanes include:

- Antiplanes abarbarea Dall, 1919
- Antiplanes abyssalis Kantor & Sysoev, 1991
- Antiplanes antigone (Dall, 1919)
- Antiplanes briseis Dall, 1919
- Antiplanes bulimoides Dall, 1919
- Antiplanes catalinae (Raymond, 1904)
- Antiplanes delicatus Okutani & Iwahori, 1992:
- Antiplanes dendritoplicata Kantor & Sysoev, 1991
- Antiplanes diomedea Bartsch, 1944
- Antiplanes habei Kantor & Sysoev, 1991
- Antiplanes isaotakii (Habe, 1958)
- Antiplanes kurilensis Kantor & Sysoev, 1991
- Antiplanes litus Dall, 1919
- Antiplanes motojimai (Habe, 1958)
- Antiplanes obesus Ozaki, 1958
- Antiplanes obliquiplicata Kantor & Sysoev, 1991
- Antiplanes profundicola Bartsch, 1944
- Antiplanes sanctiioannis (Smith E. A., 1875)
- Antiplanes spirinae Kantor & Sysoev, 1991
- Antiplanes thalaea (Dall, 1902)
- Antiplanes vinosa (Dall, 1874)
- Antiplanes yukiae (Shikama, 1962)

Species brought into synonymy

- Antiplanes agamedea Dall, 1919: synonym of Spirotropis agamedea (Dall, 1919)
- Antiplanes amphitrite Dall, 1919: synonym of Borsonella callicesta (Dall, 1902) (junior subjective synonym)
- Antiplanes amycus Dall, 1919: synonym of Rhodopetoma amycus Dall, 1919
- Antiplanes beringi (Aurivillius, 1885): synonym of Antiplanes sanctiioannis (Smith E. A., 1875)
- Antiplanes catalinae contraria Yokoyama, 1926: synonym of Antiplanes vinosa (Dall, 1874)
- Antiplanes contraria (Yokoyama, 1926): synonym of Antiplanes vinosa (Dall, 1874)
- Antiplanes diaulax (Dall, 1908): synonym of Rhodopetoma diaulax (Dall, 1908)
- Antiplanes diomedia [sic]: synonym of Antiplanes diomedea Bartsch, 1944
- Antiplanes gabbi Kantor & Sysoev, 1991: synonym of Antiplanes catalinae (Raymond, 1904)
- Antiplanes hyperia Dall, 1919: synonym of Pseudotaranis hyperia (Dall, 1919)
- Antiplanes kamchatica Dall, 1919: synonym of Antiplanes vinosa (Dall, 1874)
- Antiplanes kawamurai (Habe, 1958): synonym of Antiplanes obesus Ozaki, 1958
- Antiplanes major Bartsch, 1944: synonym of Antiplanes catalinae (Raymond, 1904)
- Antiplanes perversus (Gabb, 1865): synonym of Antiplanes catalinae (Raymond, 1904)
- Antiplanes piona Dall, 1902: synonym of Antiplanes sanctiioannis (Smith, 1875)
- Antiplanes rotula Dall, 1921: synonym of Antiplanes thalaea (Dall, 1902)
- Antiplanes sadoensis Yokoyama, 1926: synonym of Antiplanes sanctiioannis (Smith, 1875)
- Antiplanes santarosana (Dall, 1902): synonym of Antiplanes thalaea (Dall, 1902)
- Antiplanes voyi sensu (Gabb, 1866) sensu Abbott, 1974: synonym of Antiplanes catalinae (Raymond, 1904)
- Antiplanes willetti Berry, 1953: synonym of Antiplanes thalaea (Dall, 1902)
- Antiplanes yessoensis Dall, 1925: synonym of Antiplanes sanctiioannis (Smith E. A., 1875)

Taxon inquirendum

- Antiplanes piona (Dall, 1902)
