= Antiplanes delicatus =

Scientific classification
- Kingdom: Animalia
- Phylum: Mollusca
- Class: Gastropoda
- Subclass: Caenogastropoda
- Order: Neogastropoda
- Family: Pseudomelatomidae
- Genus: Antiplanes
- Species: A. delicatus

Binomial name
- Antiplanes delicatus (Okutani & Iwahori, 1992)

Synonyms
- Rectiplanes delicatus (Okutani & Iwahori, 1992)

Species of gastropod

Antiplanes delicatus is a species of sea snail, a marine gastropod mollusk in the family Pseudomelatomidae.

== Distribution ==
This marine species occurs in Tosa Bay, Japan.
