= Megasurcula elongata =

Scientific classification
- Kingdom: Animalia
- Phylum: Mollusca
- Class: Gastropoda
- Subclass: Caenogastropoda
- Order: Neogastropoda
- Superfamily: Conoidea
- Family: Pseudomelatomidae
- Genus: Megasurcula
- Species: †M. elongata

Binomial name
- †Megasurcula elongata (Hatai, 1940)

Synonyms
- †Siphonalia s−nomurai Hatai, 1941; †Surculites yokoyamai elongatus Hatai, 1940

Extinct species of gastropod

Megasurcula elongata is an extinct species of sea snail, a marine gastropod mollusk in the family Pseudomelatomidae, the turrids and allies.

== Distribution ==
Fossils of this marine species have been found in Miocene strata in Japan.
