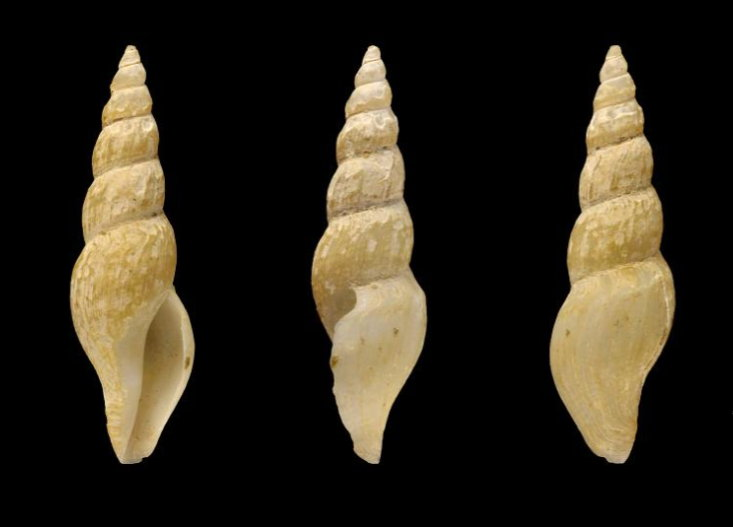
- Shell of Antiplanes litus (lectotype at the Smithsonian Institution)

Scientific classification
- Kingdom: Animalia
- Phylum: Mollusca
- Class: Gastropoda
- Subclass: Caenogastropoda
- Order: Neogastropoda
- Superfamily: Conoidea
- Family: Pseudomelatomidae
- Genus: Antiplanes
- Species: A. litus

Binomial name
- Antiplanes litus Dall, 1919

Synonyms
- Spirotropis (Antiplanes) litus (Dall, 1919); Antiplanes (Rectiplanes) litus (Dall, 1919)

= Antiplanes litus =

Species of gastropod

Antiplanes litus is a species of sea snail, a marine gastropod mollusk in the family Pseudomelatomidae.

== Description ==
The length of the shell attains 16 mm; its diameter 5 mm.

(Original description) The slender, white, acute shell has seven or eight moderately convex whorls separated by a very distinct suture. The protoconch is swollen, twisted, consists of two whorls, the second spirally threaded. On about three of the subsequent whorls these threads are developed into two or three major cords between the periphery and the suture, becoming on later whorls obsolete, or this sculpture in other specimens may be obsolete. There is also a semi-obsolete fine spiral striation covering the whole surface and somewhat stronger on the siphonal canal. There is no axial sculpture. The aperture is narrow. The anal sulcus is feeble, close to the suture hardly forming a fasciole. The outer lip is thin and slightly produced. The inner lip is erased. The columella is straight. The siphonal canal is short and wide.

== Distribution ==
The holotype of this marine species was found off Esteros Bay, California, United States
