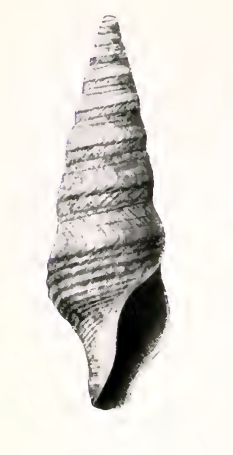
- Original image of a shell of Antiplanes briseis

Scientific classification
- Kingdom: Animalia
- Phylum: Mollusca
- Class: Gastropoda
- Subclass: Caenogastropoda
- Order: Neogastropoda
- Superfamily: Conoidea
- Family: Pseudomelatomidae
- Genus: Antiplanes
- Species: A. briseis

Binomial name
- Antiplanes briseis Dall, 1919

= Antiplanes briseis =

Species of gastropod

Antiplanes briseis is a species of sea snail, a marine gastropod mollusk in the family Pseudomelatomidae.

== Description ==
The length of the shell attains 18 mm (0.71 in), its diameter 5 mm (0.20 in).

(Original description) The elongate, acute, white shell is covered with a very pale olivaceous periostracum. It shows a blunt swollen protoconch of about a 1½ whorl (eroded) and eight subsequent rather flattish whorls. The suture is obscure and appressed. The spiral sculpture consists of one or two feeble flattish cords between the periphery and the succeeding suture on the spire, and on the body whorl about twice as many more or less obsolete. The axial sculpture consists of rather prominent, deeply arcuate incremental lines. The anal fasciole is wide and not impressed. The deepest part of the sulcusis near the periphery. The aperture is narrow. The outer lip is thin, sharp and much produced. The inner lip and the columella are erased, the latter short, straight, obliquely attenuated in front. The siphonal canal is distinct, produced and straight.

== Distribution ==
The holotype was found off Drakes Bay, California, United States.
