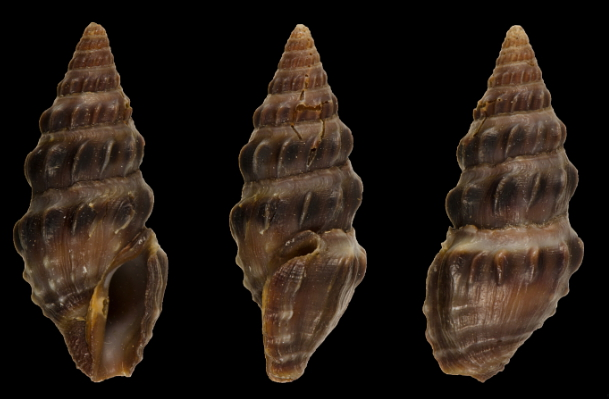
- Shell of Dallspira dalli (holotype at the Smithsonian Institution)

Scientific classification
- Kingdom: Animalia
- Phylum: Mollusca
- Class: Gastropoda
- Subclass: Caenogastropoda
- Order: Neogastropoda
- Superfamily: Conoidea
- Family: Pseudomelatomidae
- Genus: Dallspira
- Species: D. dalli

Binomial name
- Dallspira dalli P. Bartsch, 1950

= Dallspira dalli =

Species of gastropod

Dallspira dalli is a species of sea snail, a marine gastropod mollusk in the family Pseudomelatomidae, the turrids and allies.

== Distribution ==
This marine species occurs off Bella Vista, Panama.
