= Mammillaedrillia mammillata =

Scientific classification
- Kingdom: Animalia
- Phylum: Mollusca
- Class: Gastropoda
- Subclass: Caenogastropoda
- Order: Neogastropoda
- Superfamily: Conoidea
- Family: Pseudomelatomidae
- Genus: Mammillaedrillia
- Species: M. mammillata

Binomial name
- Mammillaedrillia mammillata (Kuroda & Oyama, 1971)

Synonyms
- Compsodrillia (Mammillaedrillia ) mammillata Kuroda & Oyama, 1971 (original combination); Inquisitor mammillata (Kuroda and Oyama，1971)

Species of gastropod

Mammillaedrillia mammillata is a species of sea snail, a marine gastropod mollusk in the family Pseudomelatomidae, the turrids and their allies.

== Description ==
The length of the shell attains 50.5 mm, its diameter 16 mm.

== Distribution ==
This marine species occurs in Sagami Bay, Japan and north of Taiwan
