= Antiplanes abyssalis =

Scientific classification
- Kingdom: Animalia
- Phylum: Mollusca
- Class: Gastropoda
- Subclass: Caenogastropoda
- Order: Neogastropoda
- Superfamily: Conoidea
- Family: Pseudomelatomidae
- Genus: Antiplanes
- Species: A. abyssalis

Binomial name
- Antiplanes abyssalis Kantor & Sysoev, 1991

Species of gastropod

Antiplanes abyssalis is a species of sea snail, a marine gastropod mollusk in the family Pseudomelatomidae.

== Distribution ==
This marine species occurs off the Kurile Islands, Russia
