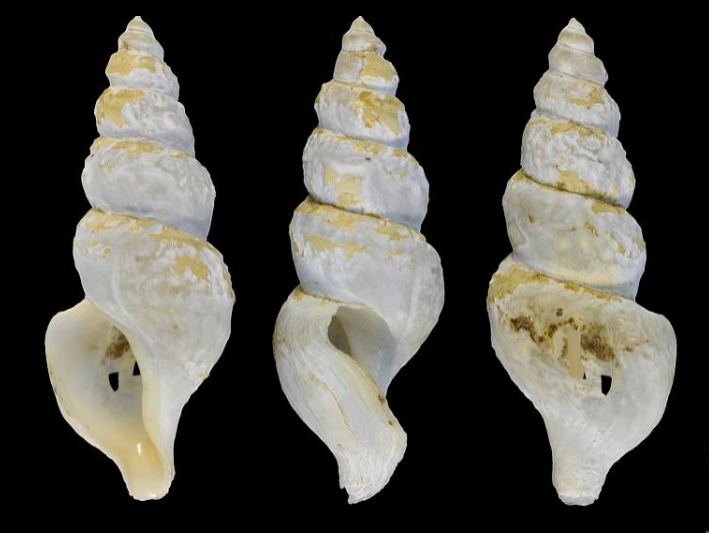
- Shell of Antiplanes diomedea (holotype at the Smithsonian Institution)

Scientific classification
- Kingdom: Animalia
- Phylum: Mollusca
- Class: Gastropoda
- Subclass: Caenogastropoda
- Order: Neogastropoda
- Superfamily: Conoidea
- Family: Pseudomelatomidae
- Genus: Antiplanes
- Species: A. diomedea

Binomial name
- Antiplanes diomedea Bartsch, 1944

Synonyms
- Antiplanes diomedia [sic] (misspelling)

= Antiplanes diomedea =

Species of gastropod

Antiplanes diomedea is a species of sea snail, a marine gastropod mollusk in the family Pseudomelatomidae.

== Description ==
The length of the shell attains 40.2 mm, its diameter 15.8 mm.

== Distribution ==
This species occurs in the Pacific Ocean off California, United States.
