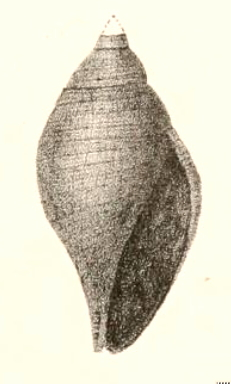
- Shell of † Megasurcula remondii(holotype)

Scientific classification
- Kingdom: Animalia
- Phylum: Mollusca
- Class: Gastropoda
- Subclass: Caenogastropoda
- Order: Neogastropoda
- Superfamily: Conoidea
- Family: Pseudomelatomidae
- Genus: Megasurcula
- Species: †M. remondii

Binomial name
- †Megasurcula remondii (W.M. Gabb, 1866)

Synonyms
- † Bathytoma gabbiana Dall, 1909 junior subjective synonym; † Metula remondii Gabb 1866; † Surculites (Megasurcula) remondii (Gabb 1866)

= Megasurcula remondii =

Species of gastropod

Megasurcula remondii is an extinct species of sea snail, a marine gastropod mollusk in the family Pseudomelatomidae, the turrids and allies.

== Description ==
The length of the shell attains 78.3 mm.

(Original description) The shell is broadly fusiform in shape and possesses an elevated spire composed of four or five whorls, which are subangulated and separated by an impressed suture. The surface is marked by numerous small, revolving ribs that are rounded with acute interspaces, and these ribs more or less regularly alternate in size. They are crossed by strong lines of growth, which, in some specimens, presents an approach to a regular reticulation.

The body whorl constitutes three-fourths of the total length of the shell; it is broadly and regularly convex in the middle and usually features a revolving depression situated just below the suture. In some instances, this groove or depression is replaced by a flat space. The aperture is long and narrow, featuring an inner lip that is slightly incrusted. While the outer lip remains unknown; the siphonal canal is straight.

== Distribution ==
Fossils of this marine species were found in Miocene strata of Arroyo San Antonio, near Tomales Bay, California.
