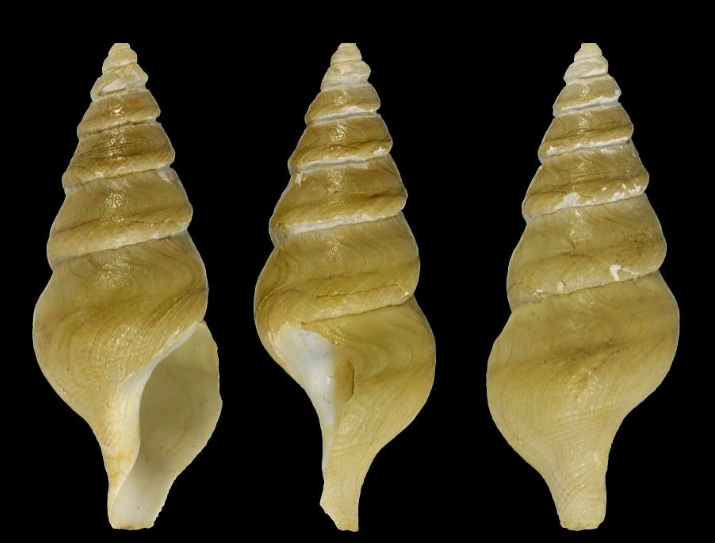
- Shell of Antiplanes sanctiioannis (holotype at the Smithsonian Institution)

Scientific classification
- Kingdom: Animalia
- Phylum: Mollusca
- Class: Gastropoda
- Subclass: Caenogastropoda
- Order: Neogastropoda
- Superfamily: Conoidea
- Family: Pseudomelatomidae
- Genus: Antiplanes
- Species: A. sanctiioannis

Binomial name
- Antiplanes sanctiioannis (E.A. Smith, 1875)

Synonyms
- Antiplanes beringi (Aurivillius, 1885); Antiplanes sadoensis Yokoyama, 1926; Antiplanes yessoensis Dall, 1925; Pleurotoma beringi Aurivillius, 1887; Pleurotoma sanctiioannis E.A. Smith, 1875 (original combination); Spirotropis (Antiplanes) perversa (Gabb, 1865)

= Antiplanes sanctiioannis =

Species of gastropod

Antiplanes sanctiioannis is a species of sea snail, a marine gastropod mollusk in the family Pseudomelatomidae, the turrids.

== Description ==
The length of the shell varies between 20 mm and 40 mm; maximum diameter 14 mm.

The fusiform shell contains 10 slightly convex whorls. The shell is clothed with a smooth, thickish, olive epidermis. The shell is covered with very narrow spiral striae and incremental flexuous stripes. The dark reddish aperture is ovate and contracted below. It measures about 2/5 of the total length. The siphonal canal is broad and slightly oblique. The narrow outer lip has a wide sinuation above the middle. The columella is twisted. The operculum is unguiform.

== Distribution ==
This marine species occurs off he Pacific Ocean coast of northern Honshu, Japan; also in the Bering Sea.
