= Calcatodrillia hololeukos =

Scientific classification
- Kingdom: Animalia
- Phylum: Mollusca
- Class: Gastropoda
- Subclass: Caenogastropoda
- Order: Neogastropoda
- Superfamily: Conoidea
- Family: Pseudomelatomidae
- Genus: Calcatodrillia
- Species: C. hololeukos

Binomial name
- Calcatodrillia hololeukos Kilburn, 1988

Species of gastropod

Calcatodrillia hololeukos is a species of sea snail, a marine gastropod mollusk in the family Pseudomelatomidae.

== Description ==
The length of the shell attains 18 mm.

== Distribution ==
This marine species occurs off the Cape Province, South Africa.
