= Meggittia maungmagana =

Scientific classification
- Kingdom: Animalia
- Phylum: Mollusca
- Class: Gastropoda
- Subclass: Caenogastropoda
- Order: Neogastropoda
- Superfamily: Conoidea
- Family: Pseudomelatomidae
- Genus: Meggittia
- Species: M. maungmagana

Binomial name
- Meggittia maungmagana Ray, 1977

Species of gastropod

Meggittia maungmagana is a species of predatory sea snail, a marine gastropod in the family Pseudomelatomidae, the turrids and allies.

== Distribution ==
This marine species occurs off Maungmagan, Lower Myanmar.
