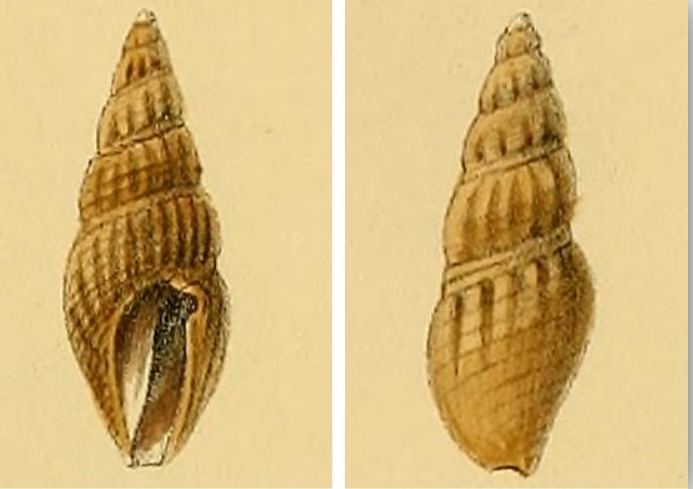
- Original image of shells of Rhodopetoma erosa

Scientific classification
- Kingdom: Animalia
- Phylum: Mollusca
- Class: Gastropoda
- Subclass: Caenogastropoda
- Order: Neogastropoda
- Superfamily: Conoidea
- Family: Pseudomelatomidae
- Genus: Rhodopetoma
- Species: R. erosa

Binomial name
- Rhodopetoma erosa (Schrenck, 1862)

Synonyms
- Lora erosa Kinoshita 1937; Bela erosa (Schrenck, 1861) superseded combination; Pleurotoma (Clavatula) erosa Schrenck, 1861 · unaccepted > superseded combination; Pleurotoma erosa Schrenck, 1862 (original combination)

= Rhodopetoma erosa =

Species of gastropod

Rhodopetoma erosa is a species of sea snail, a marine gastropod mollusk in the family Pseudomelatomidae.

Rhodopetoma erosa auct. non Schrenk, 1867 is a synonym of Propebela nobilis (Möller, 1842)

== Description ==
This marine species reaches 18 mm in length, its diameter 6.6 mm.

The shell is longitudinally ribbed and spirally striated. There is a narrow band at the suture brown, with sometimes a darker band at the suture and another at the base.

(Original description in Latin) The shell exhibits a fusiform shape with a prominent, acute apex. The coloration is generally pale corneous-brown, often transitioning to reddish-brown towards the base. Internally, the shell displays a violaceous-whitish hue, with subtle reddish-brown zones near the suture and at the base. The whorls are slightly convex, adorned with longitudinal striations and transverse, plicate costae. The earlier whorls often exhibit signs of erosion. The body whorl is encircled by a series of slightly elevated lines at the base. The suture is characterized by a row of plicate costae. The aperture is oblong with a simple, thin, and acute outer lip. The outer lip exhibits an inciso-sinuate profile below the suture line. The columella is smooth, and the siphonal canal is notably short.

== Distribution ==
This species occurs off Japan and Korea.
