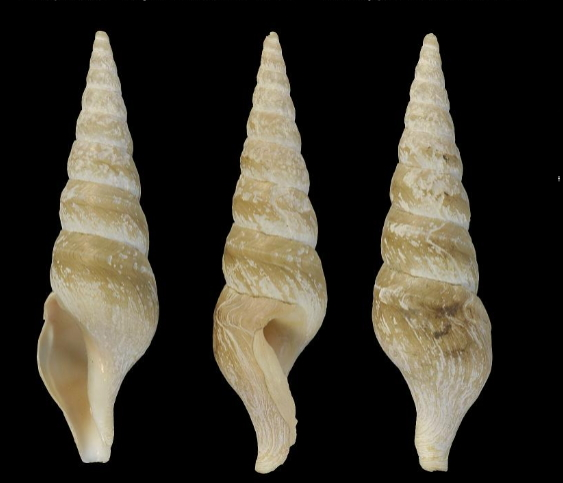
- Sinistral specimen of Antiplanes catalinae (holotype at the Smithsonian Institution)

Scientific classification
- Kingdom: Animalia
- Phylum: Mollusca
- Class: Gastropoda
- Subclass: Caenogastropoda
- Order: Neogastropoda
- Superfamily: Conoidea
- Family: Pseudomelatomidae
- Genus: Antiplanes
- Species: A. catalinae

Binomial name
- Antiplanes catalinae (Raymond, 1904)

Synonyms
- Antiplanes gabbi Kantor & Sysoev, 1991; Antiplanes major Bartsch, 1944; Antiplanes perversus (Gabb, 1865); Antiplanes voyi sensu Abbott, 1974; Bela perversa Gabb, 1865; Pleurotoma catalinae Raymond, 1904 (original combination); Pleurotoma perversa Gabb, 1865 ·; Pleurotoma (Antiplanes) catalinae Raymond, 1904 (basionym); Spirotropis (Antiplanes) perversa (Gabb, 1865) (invalid: junior homonym of Pleurotoma perversa Philippi, 1847; Antiplanes gabbi is a replacement name); Pleurotoma (Surcula) perversa Gabb, 1865 (invalid: junior homonym of Pleurotoma perversa Philippi, 1847; Antiplanes gabbi is a replacement name)

= Antiplanes catalinae =

Species of gastropod

Antiplanes catalinae is a species of sea snail, a marine gastropod mollusk in the family Pseudomelatomidae.

== Description ==
The length of the shell attains 27 mm, its diameter 7.6 mm.

(Original description) The sinistral shell is thin, elongated and slender. It contains 10-11 whorls. Its color is light, pinkish -brown, without bands. The interior of the aperture is a little lighter: The upper whorls are more or less chalky. The protoconch is smooth and inflated. The later whorls are convex. The suture is deeply impressed. The shell is sculptured by fine incremental lines and on the last whorls a few obscure, spiral striations, mostly below the periphery. The anal fascicle is traceable on the spire as a flattened or obscurely grooved band. The aperture is narrow. The siphonal canal is wide and short. The columella is nearly straight, with a well-defined callus, obliquely truncate below. The outer lip is produced and deeply emarginate near the sutural margin of the whorl.

== Distribution ==
This species occurs off the Pacific coast of Canada and the United States.
