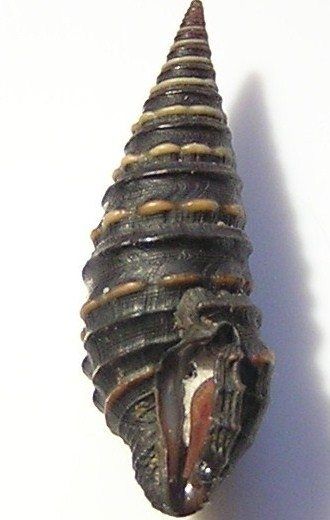
- Zonulispira chrysochildosa

Scientific classification
- Kingdom: Animalia
- Phylum: Mollusca
- Class: Gastropoda
- Subclass: Caenogastropoda
- Order: Neogastropoda
- Superfamily: Conoidea
- Family: Pseudomelatomidae
- Genus: Zonulispira
- Species: Z. chrysochildosa

Binomial name
- Zonulispira chrysochildosa Shasky, 1971

= Zonulispira chrysochildosa =

Species of gastropod

Zonulispira chrysochildosa is a species of sea snail, a marine gastropod mollusk in the family Pseudomelatomidae, one of the families commonly known as turrids.

== Description ==
The length of the shell varies between 15 mm and 21 mm.

== Distribution ==
This marine species occurs off Pacific Ocean, Panama.

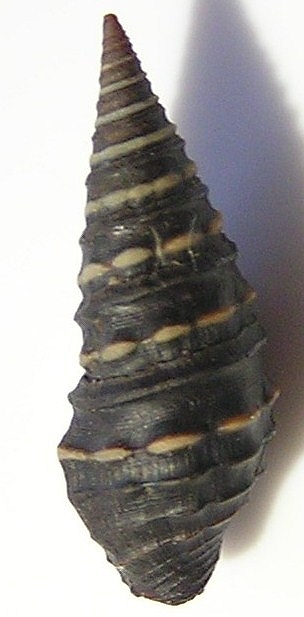
Zonulispira chrysochildosa, abapertural view
