= Kurodadrillia habui =

Scientific classification
- Kingdom: Animalia
- Phylum: Mollusca
- Class: Gastropoda
- Subclass: Caenogastropoda
- Order: Neogastropoda
- Superfamily: Conoidea
- Family: Pseudomelatomidae
- Genus: Kurodadrillia
- Species: K. habui

Binomial name
- Kurodadrillia habui Azuma, 1975

Species of gastropod

Kurodadrillia habui is a species of sea snail, a marine gastropod mollusk in the family Pseudomelatomidae, the turrids.

== Description ==
The length of the shell attains 35 mm.

== Distribution ==
This marine species occurs off Japan.
