= Megasurcula centroamericana =

Scientific classification
- Kingdom: Animalia
- Phylum: Mollusca
- Class: Gastropoda
- Subclass: Caenogastropoda
- Order: Neogastropoda
- Superfamily: Conoidea
- Family: Pseudomelatomidae
- Genus: Megasurcula
- Species: M. centroamericana

Binomial name
- Megasurcula centroamericana B.M. Landau, F. Da Silva & S.M. Heitz, 2016

Extinct species of gastropod

Megasurcula tremperiana is an extinct species of sea snail, a marine gastropod mollusk in the family Pseudomelatomidae, the turrids and allies.

== Distribution ==
Fossils of this marine species have been found in Miocene strata in Venezuela.
