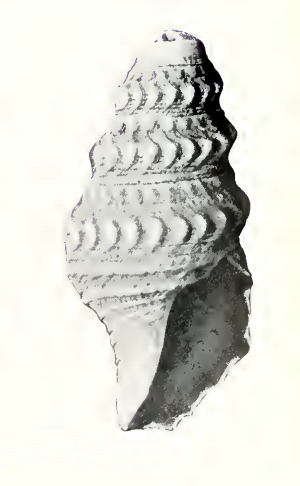
- Original image of a shell of Antiplanes antigone

Scientific classification
- Kingdom: Animalia
- Phylum: Mollusca
- Class: Gastropoda
- Subclass: Caenogastropoda
- Order: Neogastropoda
- Superfamily: Conoidea
- Family: Pseudomelatomidae
- Genus: Antiplanes
- Species: A. antigone

Binomial name
- Antiplanes antigone (Dall, 1919)

Synonyms
- Cryptogemma antigone Dall, 1919; Spirotropis antigone (Dall, 1919)

= Antiplanes antigone =

Species of gastropod

Antiplanes antigone is a species of sea snail, a marine gastropod mollusk in the family Pseudomelatomidae.

== Description ==
The height of the shell attains 23 mm (0.91 in), its diameter 10 mm (0.39 in).

(Original description) The solid, white shell has an olivaceous periostracum. The spire of the holotype is badly eroded, short, indicating a total of five whorls exclusive of the protoconch. The body whorl and a half alone retain their normal condition. The suture is distinct and not appressed. The anal fasciole is narrow, constricted and separated from the suture by an obscure ridge. In front of the fasciole is an undulated rounded ridge from which extend obliquely protractive obscure riblets more or less obsolete on the body whorl, probably stronger and more distinct on the spire when not eroded. There is also very obscure spiral grooving with much wider interspaces on the base. The entire surface is minutely irregularly vermiculate. The aperture is narrow. The anal sulcus is shallow, rounded, close to the suture. The outer lip is thin, sharp and moderately produced. The inner lip is erased. The columella is short, white and obliquely attenuated in front. The siphonal canal is short, wide and hardly differentiated.

== Distribution ==
The holotype was found off San Diego, California, United States.
