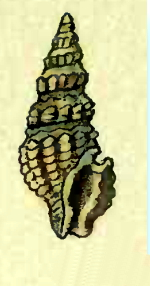
- Shell of Zonulispira crocata

Scientific classification
- Kingdom: Animalia
- Phylum: Mollusca
- Class: Gastropoda
- Subclass: Caenogastropoda
- Order: Neogastropoda
- Family: Pseudomelatomidae
- Genus: Zonulispira
- Species: Z. crocata

Binomial name
- Zonulispira crocata (Reeve, 1845)

Synonyms
- Drillia acucincta W.H. Dall, 1890; Drillia crocata L.A. Reeve, 1845 (original combination); Zonulispira sanibelensis Bartsch & Rehder, 1939

= Zonulispira crocata =

Species of gastropod

Zonulispira crocata, common name the Sanibel turrid, is a species of sea snail, a marine gastropod mollusc in the family Pseudomelatomidae.

== Description ==
The length of the shell varies between 20 mm and 29 mm.

The shell is pyramidally oblong, transversely elevately striated and longitudinally ribbed. The body whorl is furnished with a small gibbous tubercle. The siphonal canal is very short. The aperture is short. The sinus broad and large. The color of the shell is whitish, covered with a saffron-olive epidermis.

== Distribution ==
Z. crocata can be found off the western coast of Florida, United States to the Florida Keys, United States.
