= Doxospira hertleini =

Scientific classification
- Kingdom: Animalia
- Phylum: Mollusca
- Class: Gastropoda
- Subclass: Caenogastropoda
- Order: Neogastropoda
- Superfamily: Conoidea
- Family: Pseudomelatomidae
- Genus: Doxospira
- Species: D. hertleini

Binomial name
- Doxospira hertleini Shasky, 1971

Species of gastropod

Doxospira hertleini is a species of sea snail, a marine gastropod mollusk in the family Pseudomelatomidae, the turrids and allies.

== Description ==
It was first described in Shasky, D.R. (1971). "Ten new species of tropical Eastern Pacific Turridae." The Veliger. 14(1): 67-72, 1 pl where it was described as: "Shell rather large, fusiform; colour yellowish white with weak, yellowish brown bands on some specimens just superior to the suture, shell covered with a rather adherent brownish grey periostracum, protoconch of four eroded conical whorls; subsequent whorls about 12...Outer lip thin, gently flaring, smooth within and with a moderate stromboid notch at the lower end...Dimensions of holotype: height 41.8 mm, diameter 16.6 mm, length of aperture 18.5 mm."

In the original description, the author dedicates the new species of sea snail to "Dr Leo Hertlein of the California Academy of Sciences, San Francisco."

Doxospira hertleini's feeding type is predatory.

== Distribution ==
This species occurs in the Pacific Ocean off Costa Rica and Panama.
