= Pseudotaranis strongi =

Scientific classification
- Kingdom: Animalia
- Phylum: Mollusca
- Class: Gastropoda
- Subclass: Caenogastropoda
- Order: Neogastropoda
- Superfamily: Conoidea
- Family: Pseudomelatomidae
- Genus: Pseudotaranis
- Species: P. strongi

Binomial name
- Pseudotaranis strongi (Arnold, 1903)

Species of gastropod

Pseudotaranis strongi is a species of sea snail, a marine gastropod mollusk in the family Pseudomelatomidae, the turrids and allies.

== Distribution ==
This marine species occurs off California, United States.
