= Antiplanes dendritoplicata =

Scientific classification
- Kingdom: Animalia
- Phylum: Mollusca
- Class: Gastropoda
- Subclass: Caenogastropoda
- Order: Neogastropoda
- Superfamily: Conoidea
- Family: Pseudomelatomidae
- Genus: Antiplanes
- Species: A. dendritoplicata

Binomial name
- Antiplanes dendritoplicata Kantor & Sysoev, 1991

Species of gastropod

Antiplanes dendritoplicata is a species of sea snail, a marine gastropod mollusk in the family Pseudomelatomidae.

== Description ==
The length of the shell attains 35 mm.

== Distribution ==
This marine species occurs off the Kurile Islands, Russia.
