= Abyssocomitas kurilokamchatica =

Scientific classification
- Kingdom: Animalia
- Phylum: Mollusca
- Class: Gastropoda
- Subclass: Caenogastropoda
- Order: Neogastropoda
- Superfamily: Conoidea
- Family: Pseudomelatomidae
- Genus: Abyssocomitas
- Species: A. kurilokamchatica

Binomial name
- Abyssocomitas kurilokamchatica Sysoev & Kantor, 1986

Species of gastropod

Abyssocomitas kurilokamchatica is a species of sea snail, a marine gastropod mollusk in the family Pseudomelatomidae.

== Distribution ==
This is a deep-sea species, occurring in the Kuril–Kamchatka Trench in the northern Pacific Ocean.
