= Gibbaspira =

Scientific classification
- Kingdom: Animalia
- Phylum: Mollusca
- Class: Gastropoda
- Subclass: Caenogastropoda
- Order: Neogastropoda
- Superfamily: Conoidea
- Family: Pseudomelatomidae
- Genus: Gibbaspira; McLean, 1971

Type species
- Pleurotoma rudis Sowerby I, 1834

Species
- See text

Genus of gastropods

Gibbaspira is a genus of sea snails, marine gastropod mollusks in the family Pseudomelatomidae.

== Species ==
Species within the genus Gibbaspira include:

- Crassispira (Gibbaspira) dysoni (Reeve, L.A., 1846): accepted as Crassispira dysoni (Reeve, L.A., 1846)
- Crassispira (Gibbaspira) rudis (Sowerby, G.B. I, 1834): accepted as Crassispira rudis (Sowerby, G.B. I, 1834)
