= Antiplanes motojimai =

Scientific classification
- Kingdom: Animalia
- Phylum: Mollusca
- Class: Gastropoda
- Subclass: Caenogastropoda
- Order: Neogastropoda
- Superfamily: Conoidea
- Family: Pseudomelatomidae
- Genus: Antiplanes
- Species: A. motojimai

Binomial name
- Antiplanes motojimai (Habe, 1958)

Synonyms
- Rectiplanes motojimai Habe, 1958

Species of gastropod

Antiplanes motojimai is a species of sea snail, a marine gastropod mollusk in the family Pseudomelatomidae.

One subspecies: Antiplanes motojimai aquilonalis Kantor & Sysoev, 1991

== Description ==
The length of the shell attains 40 mm.

== Distribution ==
This marine species occurs off Japan.
