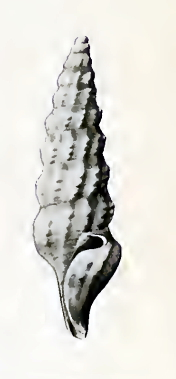
- Original image of a shell of Conticosta petilinus

Scientific classification
- Kingdom: Animalia
- Phylum: Mollusca
- Class: Gastropoda
- Subclass: Caenogastropoda
- Order: Neogastropoda
- Superfamily: Conoidea
- Family: Pseudomelatomidae
- Genus: Conticosta
- Species: C. petilinus

Binomial name
- Conticosta petilinus (Hedley, 1922)

Synonyms
- Inquisitor petilinus Hedley, 1922; Bela antarctica Strebel, 1908

= Conticosta petilinus =

Species of gastropod

Conticosta petilinus is a species of sea snail, a marine gastropod mollusk in the family Pseudomelatomidae, the turrids and allies.

== Description ==
The length of the shell attains 12.5 mm, its diameter 4.6 mm.

(Original description) The thin shell is lanceolate and sub-turreted. Its surface is smooth and glossy. The colour is buff-yellow, with two zones of raw sienna, the one subsutural, the other peripheral. The shell contains 10 whorls, of which two constitute the protoconch. The ribs are prominently round-backed, arranged at ten to a whorl. They follow each other irregularly up the spire. On the upper whorls the spirals are evanescent, and are represented by two or three beads on the ribs. On the body whorl there are about fifteen slight wide-spaced threads. The fasciole is indistinct. The aperture has a semi-circular sinus. The outer lip is simple and slightly bent inwards The siphonal canal is short, and slightly recurved.

== Distribution ==
This marine species is endemic to Australia and occurs off New South Wales
