= Megasurcula cryptoconoides =

Scientific classification
- Kingdom: Animalia
- Phylum: Mollusca
- Class: Gastropoda
- Subclass: Caenogastropoda
- Order: Neogastropoda
- Superfamily: Conoidea
- Family: Pseudomelatomidae
- Genus: Megasurcula
- Species: †M. cryptoconoides

Binomial name
- †Megasurcula cryptoconoides (J. Makiyama, 1926)

Synonyms
- †Genota cryptoconoides Makiyama, 1926

Extinct species of gastropod

Megasurcula cryptoconoides is an extinct species of sea snail, a marine gastropod mollusk in the family Pseudomelatomidae, the turrids and allies.

== Distribution ==
Fossils of this marine species have been found in Late Miocene strata in the Otokawa Formation, Japan.
