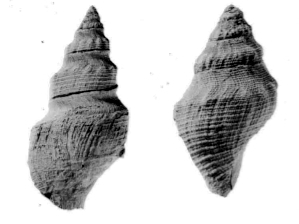

Scientific classification
- Kingdom: Animalia
- Phylum: Mollusca
- Class: Gastropoda
- Subclass: Caenogastropoda
- Order: Neogastropoda
- Superfamily: Conoidea
- Family: Pseudomelatomidae
- Genus: Megasurcula
- Species: †M. wynoocheensis

Binomial name
- †Megasurcula wynoocheensis (C.S. Weaver, 1912)

Synonyms
- Turris wynootcheensis Weaver, 1912; Turris wynoocheensis Weaver, 1916; Pseudotoma wynoocheensis (Weaver, 1912); Surculites (Megasurcula) wynoocheensis (Weaver, 1912); Megasurcula wynoocheensis (Weaver, 1912)

= Megasurcula wynoocheensis =

Extinct species of gastropod

Megasurcula wynoocheensis is an extinct species of sea snail, a marine gastropod mollusk in the family Pseudomelatomidae, the turrids and allies. The name originates from the Wynoochee Valley of Washington state.

== Description ==
The length of the shell attains 43 mm, its diameter 21.4 mm.

This is a slender, high-spired turrid with a strongly concave whorl profile and sutures riding high upon the vertical segment of the preceding whorls.

== Distribution ==
Fossils of this marine species have been found in Miocene strata in the Pacific Ocean Northwest in the United States. The type locality was a logging road west of Montesano, Washington. It has also been found in Oregon and California.
