= Antiplanes obesus =

Scientific classification
- Kingdom: Animalia
- Phylum: Mollusca
- Class: Gastropoda
- Subclass: Caenogastropoda
- Order: Neogastropoda
- Superfamily: Conoidea
- Family: Pseudomelatomidae
- Genus: Antiplanes
- Species: A. obesus

Binomial name
- Antiplanes obesus Ozaki, 1958

Synonyms
- Antiplanes kawamurai (Habe, 1958); Rectiplanes kawamurai Habe, 1958

Species of gastropod

Antiplanes obesus is a species of sea snail, a marine gastropod mollusk in the family Pseudomelatomidae. The current taxonomy was described by Hiroshi Ozaki in 1958. Obesus used to also be known as Antiplanes kawamurai and Rectiplanes kawamurai before those were made junior-level synonyms.

== Description ==
The length of the shell has been measured up to 45 mm.

== Distribution ==
This marine species occurs off Japan and the Kurile Islands, Russia.
