= Nymphispira =

Scientific classification
- Kingdom: Animalia
- Phylum: Mollusca
- Class: Gastropoda
- Subclass: Caenogastropoda
- Order: Neogastropoda
- Superfamily: Conoidea
- Family: Pseudomelatomidae
- Genus: Nymphispira; Kilburn, 1988

Type species
- Crassispira nymphia Pilsbry & H. N. Lowe, 1932

Species
- See text

Genus of gastropods

Nymphispira is a genus of sea snails, marine gastropod mollusks in the family Pseudomelatomidae.

== Species ==
- Nymphispira nymphia (Pilsbry & H. N. Lowe, 1932) : synonym of Pilsbryspira nymphia (Pilsbry & H. N. Lowe, 1932)
