= Crassispira dysoni =

Scientific classification
- Kingdom: Animalia
- Phylum: Mollusca
- Class: Gastropoda
- Subclass: Caenogastropoda
- Order: Neogastropoda
- Superfamily: Conoidea
- Family: Pseudomelatomidae
- Genus: Crassispira
- Species: C. dysoni

Binomial name
- Crassispira dysoni (Reeve, 1846)

Synonyms
- Crassispira (Gibbasoira) dysoni (Reeve, 1846); Pleurotoma dysoni Reeve, 1846

Species of gastropod

Crassispira dysoni is a species of sea snail, a marine gastropod mollusk in the family Pseudomelatomidae.

== Description ==
The length of the shell varies between 20 mm and 30 mm.

== Distribution ==
This species occurs in the Caribbean Sea from Mexico to Colombia, in particular off Panama.
