= Cretaspira =

Scientific classification
- Kingdom: Animalia
- Phylum: Mollusca
- Class: Gastropoda
- Subclass: Caenogastropoda
- Order: Neogastropoda
- Superfamily: Conoidea
- Family: Pseudomelatomidae
- Genus: Cretaspira; Kuroda & Oyama, 1971

Type species
- Cretaspira cretacea Kuroda & Oyama, 1971

Species
- See text

Genus of gastropods

Cretaspira is a genus of sea snails, marine gastropod mollusks in the family Pseudomelatomidae.

== Species ==
Species within the genus Cretaspira include:

- Cretaspira cretacea Kuroda, Habe & Oyama, 1971
