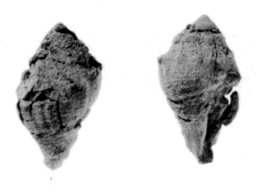
- Original image of shells of Megasurcula condonana

Scientific classification
- Kingdom: Animalia
- Phylum: Mollusca
- Class: Gastropoda
- Subclass: Caenogastropoda
- Order: Neogastropoda
- Superfamily: Conoidea
- Family: Pseudomelatomidae
- Genus: Megasurcula
- Species: M. condonana

Binomial name
- Megasurcula condonana (F.M. Anderson & B. Martin, 1914)

Synonyms
- † Bathytoma condonana F.M. Anderson & B. Martin, 1914

= Megasurcula condonana =

Extinct species of gastropod

Megasurcula condonana is an extinct species of sea snail, a marine gastropod mollusk in the family Pseudomelatomidae, the turrids and allies.

== Description ==
The length of the shell attains 32 mm, its diameter 18.3 mm.

The shell shows a characteristic stout biconic profile and 11-12 strong nodes encircling the body whorl. The Kern River specimens differ somewhat by having a uniformly lower spire with sutures riding up higher onto preceding whorls so that only the nodes on the body whorl are exposed.

== Distribution ==
Fossils of this marine species have been found in Miocene strata in Oregon and California, United States.
