= Glossispira =

Scientific classification
- Kingdom: Animalia
- Phylum: Mollusca
- Class: Gastropoda
- Subclass: Caenogastropoda
- Order: Neogastropoda
- Superfamily: Conoidea
- Family: Pseudomelatomidae
- Genus: Glossispira; McLean, 1971

Type species
- Pleurotoma harfordiana Reeve, 1843

Species
- See text

Genus of gastropods

Glossispira is a genus of sea snails, marine gastropod mollusks in the family Pseudomelatomidae.

== Species ==
Species within the genus Glossispira include:

- Glossispira harfordiana (Reeve, L.A., 1843): accepted as Crassispira harfordiana (Reeve, L.A., 1843)
