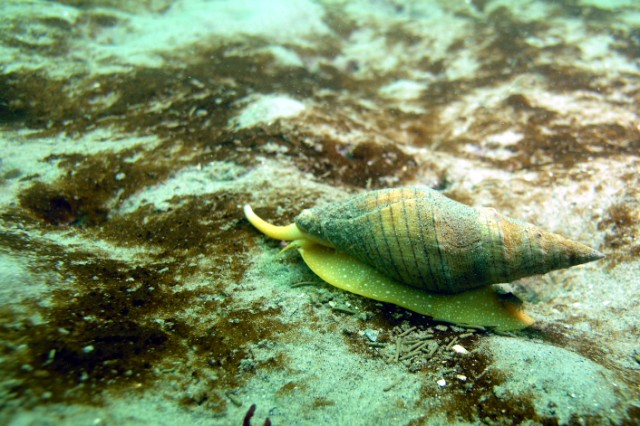

Scientific classification
- Kingdom: Animalia
- Phylum: Mollusca
- Class: Gastropoda
- Subclass: Caenogastropoda
- Order: Neogastropoda
- Superfamily: Conoidea
- Family: Pseudomelatomidae
- Genus: Megasurcula
- Species: M. carpenteriana

Binomial name
- Megasurcula carpenteriana (Gabb, 1865)

Synonyms
- Bathytoma tremperiana (Dall, 1911); Conus carpenterianus (Gabb, 1865); Conus tremperianus (Dall, 1911); Cryptoconus carpenterianus Gabb, 1865; Cryptoconus tremperianus (Dall, 1911); Megasurcula granti Bartsch, 1944; Pleurotoma (Surcula) carpenteriana Gabb, 1865 (original combination)

= Megasurcula carpenteriana =

Species of gastropod

Megasurcula carpenteriana (Gabb, 1865), also known as Carpenter's turrid, is a species of medium-sized predatory sea snail, a marine gastropod mollusc in the family Pseudomelatomidae, a family previously lumped with others collectively known as turrids. This species occurs in the Eastern Pacific Ocean. The species was named in honor of Philip Pearsall Carpenter.

== Subspecies ==
Subspecies within this species include:

- Megasurcula carpenteriana fernandoana

== Description ==
The shell is small, in the adult stage averaging about 62 mm (2.4 in) in length, against 90 to 110 mm (3.5 to 4.3 in) in length for the fully adult carpenteriana. It is proportionately much heavier, the anal fasciole is more strongly constricted, and the appressed margin of the whorl does not approach as closely to the periphery of the preceding whorl as in that species. The periphery is often marked by a minutely beaded or undulate thread, and is more nearly midway between the sutures on the spire than in carpenteriana. The aperture is shorter than the spire in nearly every case, while the reverse is true of carpenteriana.

(description of Bathytoma tremperiana compared with Bathytoma carpentaria)

== Distribution ==
This marine species occurs from California, United States to Central Baja California, Mexico
