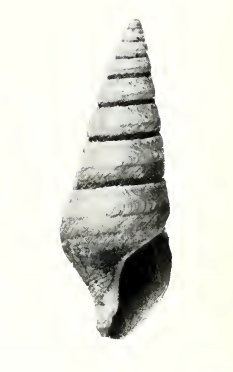
- Pseudotaranis hyperia

Scientific classification
- Kingdom: Animalia
- Phylum: Mollusca
- Class: Gastropoda
- Subclass: Caenogastropoda
- Order: Neogastropoda
- Superfamily: Conoidea
- Family: Pseudomelatomidae
- Genus: Pseudotaranis; McLean, 1995

Type species
- Mangelia strongi Arnold, 1903

Species
- See text

= Pseudotaranis =

Genus of gastropods

Pseudotaranis is a genus of sea snails, marine gastropod mollusks in the family Pseudomelatomidae, the turrids. This marine genus occurs off California, United States.

== Species ==
Species within the genus Pseudotaranis include:

- Pseudotaranis hyperia (Dall, 1919)
- Pseudotaranis strongi (Arnold, 1903)
