= Kurodadrillia =

Scientific classification
- Kingdom: Animalia
- Phylum: Mollusca
- Class: Gastropoda
- Subclass: Caenogastropoda
- Order: Neogastropoda
- Superfamily: Conoidea
- Family: Pseudomelatomidae
- Genus: Kurodadrillia; Azuma, 1975

Type species
- Kurodadrillia habui Azuma, 1975

Species
- See text

Genus of gastropods

Kurodadrillia is a genus of sea snails, marine gastropod mollusks in the family Pseudomelatomidae, the turrids and allies.

== Species ==
Species within the genus Kurodadrillia include:

- Kurodadrillia habui Azuma, 1975
