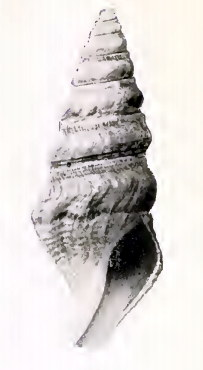
- Original image of a shell of Rhodopetoma diaulax

Scientific classification
- Kingdom: Animalia
- Phylum: Mollusca
- Class: Gastropoda
- Subclass: Caenogastropoda
- Order: Neogastropoda
- Superfamily: Conoidea
- Family: Pseudomelatomidae
- Genus: Rhodopetoma
- Species: R. diaulax

Binomial name
- Rhodopetoma diaulax (Dall, 1908)

Synonyms
- Antiplanes diaulax (Dall, 1908); Borsonella rhodope Dall, 1919; Rhodopetoma rhodope (Dall, 1919); Turris diaulax Dall, 1908 (basionym)

= Rhodopetoma diaulax =

Species of gastropod

Rhodopetoma diaulax is a species of sea snail, a marine gastropod mollusk in the family Pseudomelatomidae.

== Description ==
The shell contains seven or more whorls, exclusive of the (lost) nucleus. Its color is white covered with a pale olivaceous periostracum. The suture is distinct, not appressed. The axial sculpture consists of rather strong irregular incremental lines. The spiral sculpture consists of a thickened band between the suture and the somewhat constricted anal fasciole. At the shoulder there is a blunt angulation, in front of which are two obscure threads followed by a more distinct thread on which the suture is laid. On the body whorl in front of the angulation there are about 18 threads growing smaller and more close-set anteriorly. There is no siphonal fasciole. The aperture is rather narrow. The anal sulcus is shallow rounded. The outer lip is thin, arcuate, and sharp. The inner lip is erased. The columella is straight, and obliquely attenuated in front. The siphonal canal is rather wide, not recurved.

The height of shell is 19 mm; of the body whorl, 11 mm; the diameter: 7 mm.

== Distribution ==
This marine species occurs off Santa Rosa Island, California, United States.
