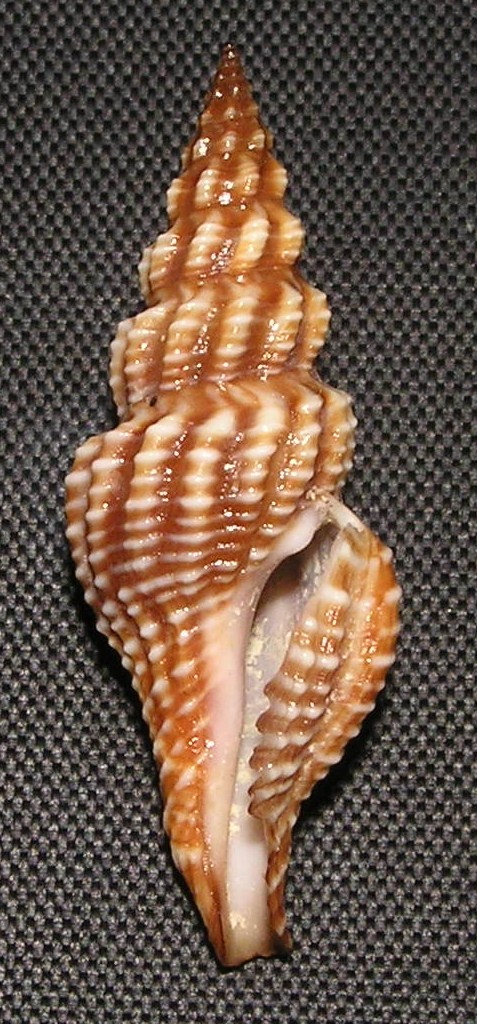
- Apertural view of the shell

Scientific classification
- Kingdom: Animalia
- Phylum: Mollusca
- Class: Gastropoda
- Subclass: Caenogastropoda
- Order: Neogastropoda
- Family: Pseudomelatomidae
- Genus: Aguilaria; J. D. Taylor & Wells, 1994
- Species: A. subochracea

Binomial name
- Aguilaria subochracea (E.A. Smith, 1877)
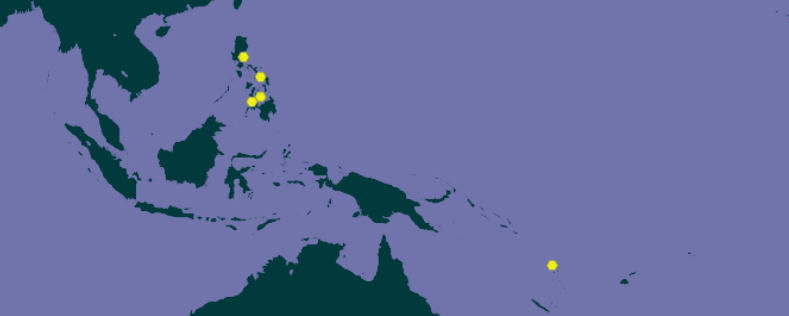

Synonyms
- Inquisitor subochracea (E. A. Smith, 1877); Pleurotoma (Drillia) subochracea E. A. Smith, 1877 (basionym); Pleurotoma subochracea E.A. Smith, 1877 (original combination); Ptychobela subochracea Springsteen and Leobrera 1986

= Aguilaria =

Genus of molluscs

Aguilaria subochracea is a species of sea snails in the family Pseudomelatomidae..

It is the only species in the genus Aguilaria.

== Description ==
The length of the shell attains 39 mm, its diameter 11 mm.

The elongate, fusiform, turreted shell is distinctively colored. Its uniform reddish-ochre hue is interrupted by white, slightly nodulous transverse lirations — five in the penultimate whorl and about 22 in the body whorl — where they intersect the ribs or plications, which number 14 in the body whorl. The suture is sharply defined by the abrupt termination of the ribs. The shell comprises 13 convex whorls that are set back at the top. The aperture is flesh-colored, ovate at the top, and concludes in a moderately elongated, recurved siphonal canal, measuring about 3/7 of the total shell length. The outer lip is somewhat thickened and sinuate in the excavation, while the columella is twisted, callous, and displays a small tubercle at the top.

== Distribution ==
This species occurs in the "China Seas" and off the Philippines and Vanuatu.
