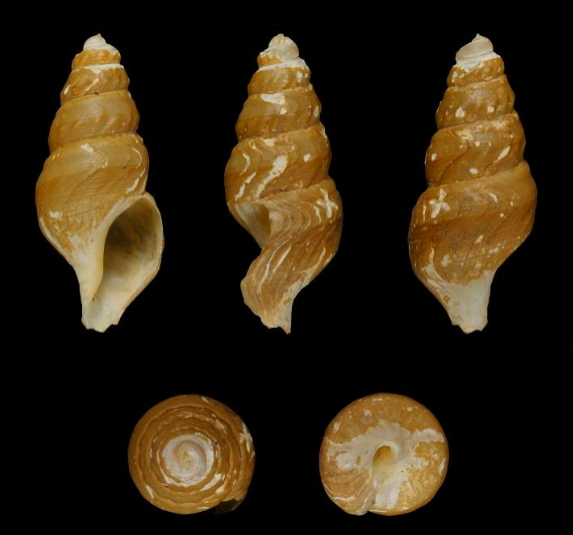
- shell of Rhodopetoma amycus (holotype at the Smithsonian Institution)

Scientific classification
- Kingdom: Animalia
- Phylum: Mollusca
- Class: Gastropoda
- Subclass: Caenogastropoda
- Order: Neogastropoda
- Superfamily: Conoidea
- Family: Pseudomelatomidae
- Genus: Rhodopetoma
- Species: R. amycus

Binomial name
- Rhodopetoma amycus (Dall, 1919)

Synonyms
- Antiplanes amycus Dall, 1919; Leucosyrinx kantori J. H. McLean, 1995 (unnecessary replacement name for Antiplanes amycus, by McLean treated as a secondary homonym of Leucosyrinx amycus)

= Rhodopetoma amycus =

Species of gastropod

Rhodopetoma amycus is a species of sea snail, a marine gastropod mollusk in the family Pseudomelatomidae, the turrids and allies. The taxon is named after a Russian malacologist Yuri Kantor.

== Description ==
The length of the shell attains 21.5 mm, its diameter 9.5 mm.

(Original description) The white shell is covered with a brownish olive periostracum. The shell contains five or more moderately rounded whorls exclusive of the (lost) protoconch. The suture is distinct with a wide rounded ridge in front of it, forming the posterior boundary of the anal fasciole. The spiral sculpture consists of a few obscure threads on the fasciole and in front of the shoulder 8 or 9, on the body whorl 15 to 18 flattish, rather close-set threads smaller and closer anteriorly and absent from the siphonal canal. The axial sculpture consists of more or less distinct incremental lines. On the upper spire, there are about 15 very oblique, anteriorly protracted riblets, chiefly visible at the shoulder and obsolete on or entirely absent from the last two whorls. The anal sulcus is wide, deep, and rounded; the fasciole slightly impressed. The outer lip is thin, sharp and arcuately produced. The inner lip is erased. The columella is short, white, obliquely attenuated in front. The siphonal canal is short, wide, distinct and slightly recurved.

== Distribution ==
This marine species occurs off California, United States.
