= Boreocomitas =

Scientific classification
- Kingdom: Animalia
- Phylum: Mollusca
- Class: Gastropoda
- Subclass: Caenogastropoda
- Order: Neogastropoda
- Superfamily: Conoidea
- Family: Pseudomelatomidae
- Genus: †Boreocomitas; Hickman, 1976

Species
- See text

Synonyms
- † Comitas (Boreocomitas) Hickman, 1976 † (original rank)

Extinct genus of gastropods

Boreocomitas is a genus of extinct sea snails, marine gastropod mollusks in the family Pseudomelatomidae, the turrids and allies.

== Species ==
Species within the genus Boreocomitas include:

- † Boreocomitas brevior (Koenen, 1885)
- † Boreocomitas inouei Amano, Hryniewicz & R. G. Jenkins, 2018
- † Boreocomitas oregonensis (Hickman, 1976)
