= Antiplanes yukiae =

Scientific classification
- Kingdom: Animalia
- Phylum: Mollusca
- Class: Gastropoda
- Subclass: Caenogastropoda
- Order: Neogastropoda
- Superfamily: Conoidea
- Family: Pseudomelatomidae
- Genus: Antiplanes
- Species: A. yukiae

Binomial name
- Antiplanes yukiae (Shikama, 1962)

Synonyms
- Benthodaphne yukiae (Shikama, 1962); Comitas yukiae (Shikama, 1962); Rectiplanes yukiae Shikama, 1962 (original combination)

Species of gastropod

Antiplanes yukiae is a species of sea snail, a marine gastropod mollusc in the family Pseudomelatomidae.

The generic position of this species remains unresolved. It is provisionally kept in Antiplanes.

== Distribution ==
This marine species occurs off Japan.
