= Dallspira =

Scientific classification
- Kingdom: Animalia
- Phylum: Mollusca
- Class: Gastropoda
- Subclass: Caenogastropoda
- Order: Neogastropoda
- Superfamily: Conoidea
- Family: Pseudomelatomidae
- Genus: Dallspira; Bartsch, 1950

Type species
- Dallspira dalli Bartsch, 1950

Species
- See text

Genus of gastropods

Dallspira is a genus of sea snails, marine gastropod mollusks in the family Pseudomelatomidae.

It was previously considered a subgenus of Crassispira

== Species ==
Species within the genus Dallspira include:

- Dallspira dalli Bartsch, 1950

Species brought into synonymy

- Dallspira abdera (W.H. Dall, 1919)
- Dallspira lowei "Watson, R.B." Bartsch, P., 1950

All these synonyms are considered by WoRMS as synonyms of Crassispira abdera (W.H.Dall, 1919)
