= Abyssocomitas =

Scientific classification
- Kingdom: Animalia
- Phylum: Mollusca
- Class: Gastropoda
- Subclass: Caenogastropoda
- Order: Neogastropoda
- Superfamily: Conoidea
- Family: Pseudomelatomidae
- Genus: Abyssocomitas; Sysoev & Kantor, 1986

Type species
- Abyssocomitas kurilokamchatica Sysoev & Kantor, 1986

Species
- See text

Genus of gastropods

Abyssocomitas is a genus of sea snails, marine gastropod mollusks in the family Pseudomelatomidae.

== Species ==
Species within the genus Abyssocomitas include:

- Abyssocomitas kurilokamchatica Sysoev & Kantor, 1986
