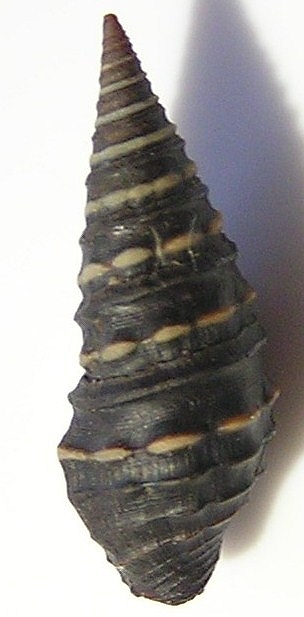
- Zonulispira chrysochildosa

Scientific classification
- Kingdom: Animalia
- Phylum: Mollusca
- Class: Gastropoda
- Subclass: Caenogastropoda
- Order: Neogastropoda
- Superfamily: Conoidea
- Family: Pseudomelatomidae
- Genus: Zonulispira; Bartsch, 1950

Type species
- Pleurotoma zonulata Reeve, 1842

Species
- See text

= Zonulispira =

Genus of gastropods

Zonulispira is a genus of sea snails, marine gastropod mollusks in the family Pseudomelatomidae.

== Species ==
Species within the genus Zonulispira include:

- Zonulispira chrysochildosa Shasky, 1971
- Zonulispira crocata (Reeve, 1845)
- Zonulispira grandimaculata (Adams C. B., 1852)
- Zonulispira zonulata (Reeve, 1842)

Species brought into synonymy

- Zonulispira dirce Dall, 1919: synonym of Zonulispira grandimaculata (Adams C. B., 1852)
- Zonulispira sanibelensis Bartsch & Rehder, 1939: synonym of Zonulispira crocata (Reeve, 1845)
