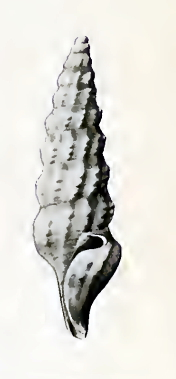
- Conticosta petilinus

Scientific classification
- Kingdom: Animalia
- Phylum: Mollusca
- Class: Gastropoda
- Subclass: Caenogastropoda
- Order: Neogastropoda
- Superfamily: Conoidea
- Family: Pseudomelatomidae
- Genus: Conticosta; Laseron, 1954

Type species
- Inquisitor petilinus Hedley, 1922

Species
- See text

= Conticosta =

Genus of gastropods

Conticosta is a genus of sea snails, marine gastropod mollusks in the family Pseudomelatomidae.

== Species ==
Species within the genus Conticosta include:

- Conticosta petilinus Hedley, 1922
