= Mammillaedrillia =

Scientific classification
- Kingdom: Animalia
- Phylum: Mollusca
- Class: Gastropoda
- Subclass: Caenogastropoda
- Order: Neogastropoda
- Superfamily: Conoidea
- Family: Pseudomelatomidae
- Genus: Mammillaedrillia; Kuroda & Oyama, 1971

Type species
- Compsodrillia mammillata Kuroda & Oyama, 1971

Species
- See text

Genus of gastropods

Mammillaedrillia is a genus of sea snails, marine gastropod mollusks in the family Pseudomelatomidae, the turrids and allies.

== Species ==
- Mammillaedrillia mammillata (Kuroda et Oyama，1971)
