= Clavatoma =

Scientific classification
- Kingdom: Animalia
- Phylum: Mollusca
- Class: Gastropoda
- Subclass: Caenogastropoda
- Order: Neogastropoda
- Superfamily: Conoidea
- Family: Pseudomelatomidae
- Genus: †Clavatoma; Powell, 1942
- Species: †C. pulchra

Binomial name
- †Clavatoma pulchra Powell, 1942

Extinct genus of gastropods

Clavatoma is an extinct genus of sea snails, marine gastropod mollusks in the family Pseudomelatomidae.

== Species ==
- † Clavatoma pulchra Powell, 1942
