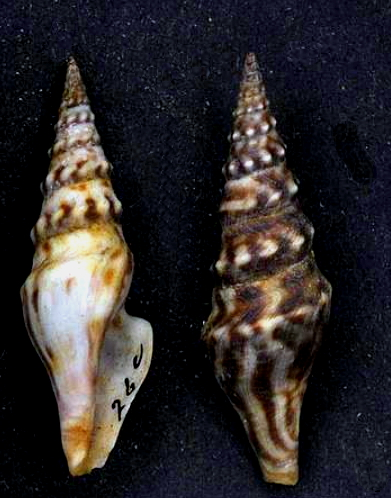
- Shells of Hormospira maculosa (specimens at Naturalis Biodiversity Centert)

Scientific classification
- Kingdom: Animalia
- Phylum: Mollusca
- Class: Gastropoda
- Subclass: Caenogastropoda
- Order: Neogastropoda
- Superfamily: Conoidea
- Family: Pseudomelatomidae
- Genus: Hormospira (Sowerby I, 1834)
- Species: H. maculosa

Binomial name
- Hormospira maculosa (G.B. Sowerby I, 1834)

Synonyms
- Pleurotoma (Surcula) maculosa Sowerby I, 1834; Surcula maculosa Sowerby I, 1834

= Hormospira =

Genus of gastropods

Hormospira is a genus of small sea snails, marine gastropod mollusks in the family Pseudomelatomidae, containing the single species Hormospira maculosa.

== Description ==
The length of the shell attains 50 mm its diameter 13 mm.

The shell is smooth, or with light revolving striae. The shoulder of the whorls are angulated and defined by a row of tubercles. The shell is flesh-colored, light brown, or light purplish, with chestnut maculations.

== Distribution ==
This marine species occurs off Sonora, Mexico.
