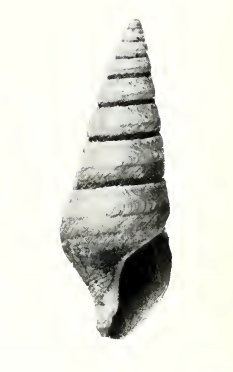
- Original image of a shell of Pseudotaranis hyperia

Scientific classification
- Kingdom: Animalia
- Phylum: Mollusca
- Class: Gastropoda
- Subclass: Caenogastropoda
- Order: Neogastropoda
- Superfamily: Conoidea
- Family: Pseudomelatomidae
- Genus: Pseudotaranis
- Species: P. hyperia

Binomial name
- Pseudotaranis hyperia ((Dall, 1919)

Synonyms
- Antiplanes hyperia Dall, 1919

= Pseudotaranis hyperia =

Species of gastropod

Pseudotaranis hyperia is a species of sea snail, a marine gastropod mollusk in the family Pseudomelatomidae, the turrids and allies.

== Description ==
Height of five whorls, 12 mm; of body whorl, 7 mm; diameter of decollation, 1.7 mm.; of body whorl, 4.5 mm.

(Original description) The shell contains more than six hardly rounded whorls (decollate). These are white, with a dark olive periostracum, the base white. The suture is appressed, distinct, the whorl in front of it is constricted. The spiral sculpture consists of (on the body whorl) a sharp thread or low keel above the periphery, two more at the periphery. On the anterior one the suture is laid and it also forms the anterior boundary of the dark coloration. On the base are about five less conspicuous threads; all these have much wider interspaces. The axial sculpture consists of moderately conspicuous incremental lines. The anal sulcus is wide and extremely shallow, the deepest portion at the posterior keel. There is no well-defined fascicle. The aperture is short and wide. The outer lip is thin, only slightly produced in front of the sulcus. The inner lip is erased. The columella is very short. The siphonal canal is very short and wide, but distinct, slightly recurved and with an inconspicuous siphonal fasciole.

== Distribution ==
This marine species occurs off California, United States.
