= Megasurcula guayasensis =

Scientific classification
- Kingdom: Animalia
- Phylum: Mollusca
- Class: Gastropoda
- Subclass: Caenogastropoda
- Order: Neogastropoda
- Superfamily: Conoidea
- Family: Pseudomelatomidae
- Genus: Megasurcula
- Species: †M. guayasensis

Binomial name
- †Megasurcula guayasensis (E.S. Marks, 1951)

Extinct species of gastropod

Megasurcula guayasensis is an extinct species of sea snail, a marine gastropod mollusk in the family Pseudomelatomidae, the turrids and allies.

== Distribution ==
Fossils of this marine species have been found in Miocene strata in Ecuador.
