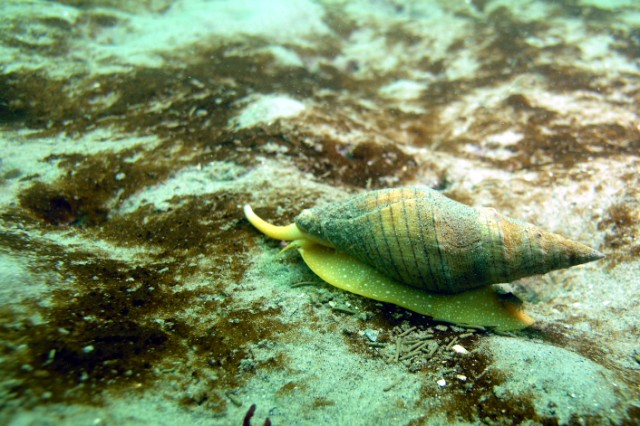
- A live individual of Megasurcula carpenteriana on the sea bed

Scientific classification
- Kingdom: Animalia
- Phylum: Mollusca
- Class: Gastropoda
- Subclass: Caenogastropoda
- Order: Neogastropoda
- Superfamily: Conoidea
- Family: Pseudomelatomidae
- Genus: Megasurcula; Casey, 1904

Type species
- Pleurotoma (Surcula) carpenteriana Gabb, 1865

Species
- See text

= Megasurcula =

Genus of gastropods

Megasurcula is a genus of medium-sized predatory sea snails, marine gastropod molluscs in the family Pseudomelatomidae, a family previously lumped with others collectively known as turrids. Species within this genus occur in the Eastern Pacific Ocean.

== Description ==
(Original description) The embryo in this genus is apparently paucispiral, but conoidal. The siphonal canal is obsolete. The base of the shell is broadly obtuse. The columella shows an oblique ridge externally. The sinus is large and broadly rounded and very near the suture. The fasciolar surface below the suture is broad and feebly concave. The periphery is obtuse and not very prominent. The suture is simple, without a subjacent elevated collar. The surface is rendered somewhat rough by relatively fine, close-set and irregular spiral lines. There is no longitudinal sculpture except lines of growth.

The species are large and ponderous, and include Megasurcula carpenteriana (Gabb, 1865) and Surcula tryoni Gabb 1865, from the coast of California.

Megasurcula is a widely isolated and strongly characterized genus, belonging exclusively to the living fauna of the Pacific coast of North America as far as known at present. It is, at the same time, a rather direct descendant of the extinct Bathytoma, but the species are of far larger size, carpenteriana being probably the largest or most ponderous Pleurotomid known. The embryo, which is conoidal and multispiral in Bathytoma, has gradually lost some of its whorls, as shown in Megasurcula, which of itself would not be a generic character, but there is in Bathytoma a broad constriction of the body whorl below the convexity, forming a short stout beak, which is wholly unobservable in Megasurcula, and the aperture is much more capacious in the latter, with the anal sinus much larger and different in form and position.

== Species ==
Species within the genus Megasurcula include:

- Megasurcula carpenteriana (Gabb, 1865)
- † Megasurcula centroamericana Landau, Da Silva & Heitz, 2016
- † Megasurcula condonana (Anderson & Martin, 1914)
- † Megasurcula cryptoconoides Makiyama, 1926
- † Megasurcula elongata (Hatai, 1940)
- † Megasurcula guayasensis Marks, 1951
- † Megasurcula howei Hanna and Hertlein, 1938
- † Megasurcula kurodai (Otuka, 1934)
- † Megasurcula osawanoensis (Tsuda)
- † Megasurcula rara (Nomura & Onishi, 1940)
- † Megasurcula remondii (Gabb, 1866)
- † Megasurcula siogamensis (Nomura, 1935)
- Megasurcula stearnsiana (Raymond, 1904)
- Megasurcula tremperiana (Dall, 1911)
- † Megasurcula wynoocheensis (Weaver, 1912)
- † Megasurcula yokoyamai (Otuka, 1934)

Species brought into synonymy

- † Megasurcula etheringtoni Weaver, 1943: synonym of † Megasurcula howei Hanna and Hertlein, 1938
- Megasurcula granti Bartsch, 1944: synonym of Pleurotoma (Surcula) carpenteriana Gabb, 1865
- † Megasurcula keepi (Arnold) Grant and Gale, 1931: synonym of † Megasurcula howei Hanna and Hertlein, 1938
