= Doxospira =

Scientific classification
- Kingdom: Animalia
- Phylum: Mollusca
- Class: Gastropoda
- Subclass: Caenogastropoda
- Order: Neogastropoda
- Superfamily: Conoidea
- Family: Pseudomelatomidae
- Genus: Doxospira; McLean, 1971

Type species
- Doxospira hertleini Shasky, 1971

Species
- See text

Genus of gastropods

Doxospira is a genus of sea snails, marine gastropod mollusks in the family Pseudomelatomidae,.

== Species ==
Species within the genus Doxospira include:

- Doxospira hertleini Shasky, 1971
