= Striospira =

Scientific classification
- Kingdom: Animalia
- Phylum: Mollusca
- Class: Gastropoda
- Subclass: Caenogastropoda
- Order: Neogastropoda
- Superfamily: Conoidea
- Family: Pseudomelatomidae
- Genus: Striospira; Bartsch, 1950

Type species
- Striospira lucasensis Bartsch, 1950

Species
- See text

Genus of gastropods

Striospira is a genus of sea snails, marine gastropod mollusks in the family Pseudomelatomidae, the turrids and allies.

== Species brought into synonymy ==
- Striospira lucasensis Bartsch, 1950: synonym of Crassispira kluthi Jordan, 1936
