= Meggittia =

Scientific classification
- Kingdom: Animalia
- Phylum: Mollusca
- Class: Gastropoda
- Subclass: Caenogastropoda
- Order: Neogastropoda
- Family: Pseudomelatomidae
- Genus: Meggittia; Ray, 1977

Type species
- Meggittia maungmagana Ray, 1977

Species
- See text

Genus of gastropods

Meggittia is a genus of predatory sea snails, marine gastropod molluscs in the family Pseudomelatomidae, the turrids and allies.

Not to be confused with Meggittia Lopez-Neyra, 1929; a genus of cestodes in the family Davaineidae.

== Species ==
- Meggittia maungmagana Ray, 1977
