= Calcatodrillia =

Scientific classification
- Kingdom: Animalia
- Phylum: Mollusca
- Class: Gastropoda
- Subclass: Caenogastropoda
- Order: Neogastropoda
- Superfamily: Conoidea
- Family: Pseudomelatomidae
- Genus: Calcatodrillia; Kilburn, 1988

Type species
- Calcatodrillia chamaeleon Kilburn, 1988

Species
- See text

Genus of gastropods

Calcatodrillia is a genus of sea snails, marine gastropod mollusks in the family Pseudomelatomidae,.

== Species ==
Species within the genus Calcatodrillia include:

- Calcatodrillia chamaeleon Kilburn, 1988
- Calcatodrillia hololeukos Kilburn, 1988
