= Anticomitas =

Scientific classification
- Kingdom: Animalia
- Phylum: Mollusca
- Class: Gastropoda
- Subclass: Caenogastropoda
- Order: Neogastropoda
- Family: Pseudomelatomidae
- Genus: Anticomitas; Powell, 1942
- Species: A. vivens

Binomial name
- Anticomitas vivens Powell, 1942

Genus of molluscs

Anticomitas vivens is a species of sea snail in the family Pseudomelatomidae. It is the only species in the genus Anticomitas.

== Description ==
The length of the shell attains 9.5 mm, its diameter 4 mm.

== Distribution ==
This marine species is endemic to New Zealand, where it occurs off Three Kings Islands.
