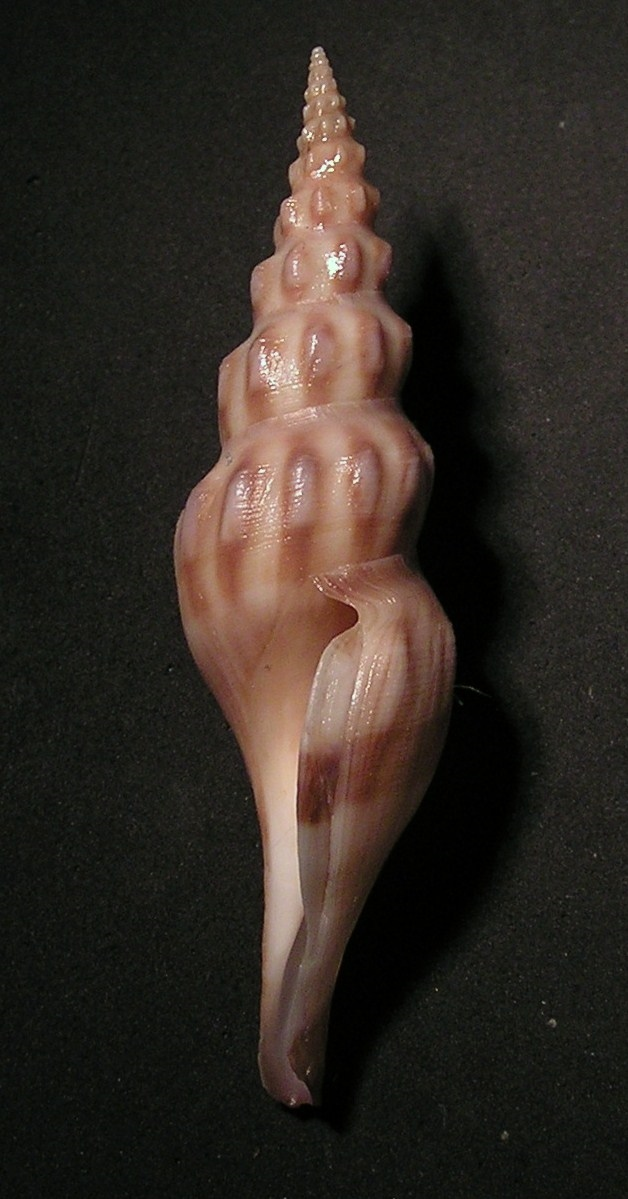
- Apertural view of a shell of Comitas peelae

Scientific classification
- Kingdom: Animalia
- Phylum: Mollusca
- Class: Gastropoda
- Subclass: Caenogastropoda
- Order: Neogastropoda
- Superfamily: Conoidea
- Family: Pseudomelatomidae; Morrison, 1966

Type genus
- Pseudomelatoma Dall, 1918

Genera
- See text

Synonyms
- Crassispirinae McLean, 1971; Zonulispirinae McLean, 1971

= Pseudomelatomidae =

Family of gastropods

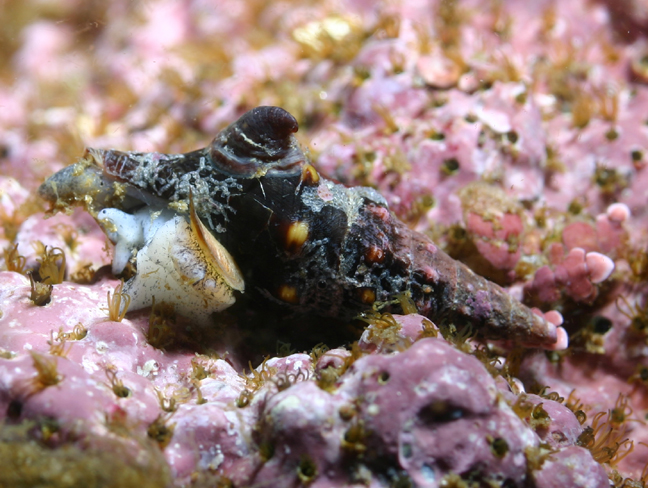
A live individual of Pseudomelatoma torosa in situ with an attached individual of Crepidula adunca on top.

Pseudomelatomidae is a family of predatory sea snails, marine gastropods included in the superfamily Conoidea (previously Conacea) and part of the Neogastropoda (Bouchet & Rocroi, 2005).

In 1995 Kantor elevated the subfamily Pseudomelatominae to the status of family Pseudomelatomidae.

In 2011 Bouchet, Kantor et al. moved the Crassispirinae and Zonulispirinae and numerous genera of snails loosely called turrid snails (which at that point had been placed in the family Conidae) and placed them in the family Pseudomelatomidae. This was based on a cladistic analysis of shell morphology, radular characteristics, anatomical characters, and a dataset of molecular sequences of three gene fragments.

== Genera ==
Genera within the family Pseudomelatomidae include:

- Abyssocomitas Sysoev & Kantor, 1986
- Aguilaria Taylor & Wells, 1994
- Anticomitas Powell, 1942
- Antimelatoma Powell, 1942
- Antiplanes Dall, 1902
- Austrotoma Finlay, 1924
- Benthodaphne Oyama, 1962
- † Boreocomitas Hickman, 1976
- Brachytoma Swainson, 1840
- Burchia Bartsch, 1944
- Buridrillia Olsson, 1942
- Calcatodrillia Kilburn, 1988
- Carinodrillia Dall, 1919
- Carinoturris Bartsch, 1944
- Cheungbeia Taylor & Wells, 1994
- † Clavatoma Powell, 1942
- Cleospira McLean, 1971
- Comitas Finlay, 1926
- Compsodrillia Woodring, 1928
- Conorbela Powell, 1951
- Conticosta Laseron, 1954
- Crassiclava McLean, 1971
- Crassispira Swainson, 1840
- Cretaspira Kuroda & Oyama, 1971
- Dallspira Bartsch, 1950
- Doxospira McLean, 1971
- Funa Kilburn, 1988
- Gibbaspira McLean, 1971
- Glossispira McLean, 1971
- Hindsiclava Hertlein & A.M. Strong, 1955
- Hormospira Berry, 1958
- Inquisitor Hedley, 1918
- Knefastia Dall, 1919
- Kurilohadalia Sysoev & Kantor, 1986
- Kurodadrillia Azuma, 1975
- Leucosyrinx Dall, 1889
- Lioglyphostoma Woodring, 1928
- Maesiella McLean, 1971
- Mammillaedrillia Kuroda & Oyama, 1971
- Megasurcula Casey, 1904
- Meggittia Ray, 1977
- Miraclathurella Woodring, 1928
- Monilispira Bartsch & Rehder, 1939
- Naudedrillia Kilburn, 1988
- Nymphispira McLean, 1971
- Otitoma Jousseaume, 1898
- Paracomitas Powell, 1942
- Pilsbryspira Bartsch, 1950
- Plicisyrinx Sysoev & Kantor, 1986
- Pseudomelatoma Dall, 1918
- Pseudotaranis McLean, 1995
- Ptychobela Thiele, 1925
- Pyrgospira McLean, 1971
- Rhodopetoma Bartsch, 1944
- Sediliopsis Petuch, 1988
- Shutonia van der Bijl, 1993
- Strictispira McLean, 1971
- Striospira Bartsch, 1950
- Thelecythara Woodring, 1928
- Tiariturris Berry, 1958
- Viridrillia Bartsch, 1943
- Zonulispira Bartsch, 1950

== Genera brought into synonymy ==
- Epidirona Iredale, 1931: synonym of Epideira Hedley, 1918
- Lioglyphostomella Shuto, 1970: synonym of Otitoma Jousseaume, 1898
- Macrosinus Beu, 1970: synonym of Paracomitas Powell, 1942
- Rectiplanes Bartsch, 1944: synonym of Antiplanes Dall, 1902
- Rectisulcus Habe, 1958: synonym of Antiplanes Dall, 1902
- Schepmania Shuto, 1970: synonym of Shutonia van der Bijl, 1993
- Thelecytharella Shuto, 1969: synonym of Otitoma Jousseaume, 1898
- Turrigemma Berry, 1958: synonym of Hindsiclava Hertlein & A.M. Strong, 1955
- Viridrillina Bartsch, 1943: synonym of Viridrillia Bartsch, 1943

== Genera moved to another family ==
- Austrocarina Laseron, 1954 has been moved to the family Horaiclavidae.
